= Paranasuchus =

Paranasuchus Temporal range: Late Miocene

Scientific classification
- Kingdom: Animalia
- Phylum: Chordata
- Class: Reptilia
- Clade: Archosauria
- Order: Crocodilia
- Family: Alligatoridae
- Subfamily: Caimaninae
- Genus: †Paranasuchus; Bona et al., 2024

Type species
- Paranasuchus gasparinae (Bona & Carabajal et al., 2013)

Synonyms
- Caiman gasparinae Bona & Carabajal et al., 2013

Genus of caiman

Paranasuchus is an extinct genus of large caiman from the Late Miocene Ituzaingó Formation of Argentina. The type species was originally described as a new species of Caiman, C. gasparinae, in 2013, but a study from 2024 concluded that it differed significantly enough to represent its own genus. Paranasuchus was a large caiman with a broad skull and was only one of several generalized caimans that inhabited Paraná during the Late Miocene.

== History and naming ==
The holotype of Paranasuchus consists of a partial snout (including a premaxilla, maxilla an other adjacent bones) as well as an associated skull table from Argentinas Ituzaingó Formation. Though the material had been considered to be referrable to the extant broad-snouted caiman in an unpublished doctoral thesis by Zulma Brandoni de Gasparini, a much later study from 2013 highlighted that this assumption was seemingly proposed without any actual justification or evidence. The study by Paula Bona & Ariana Paulina Carabajal instead proposed that the material represented a distinct species, which they dubbed Caiman gasparinae. In addition to the type material, they also assigned a fragment of a premaxilla to the species that had previously been known under the names Alligator? ameghinoi and Xenosuchus paranesis ameghinoi. Nearly a decade later, Caiman gasparinae was once again reanalyzed and compared to extensive caiman material as well as other fossil crocodilians from the Ituzaingó Formation. In addition to assigning even more specimens to the species, this study showed that it was not only distinct on a species level, but actually represented an entirely new genus, which was named Paranasuchus gasparinae.

The name Paranasuchus translates to "Crocodile from Paraná", named so for the banks of the Paraná River where the fossils had been found. This parallels the name Paranacaiman, known from the same deposits and published in the same study. The species name meanwhile honors paleontologist Zulma Brandoni de Gasparini, chosen as she spent much of her life studying extinct crocodyliforms.

== Description ==
In general morphology Paranasuchus bears close resemblance to modern caimans with a broad snout, though the bones that form the very tip are noticeably lower than in modern forms. Looking at the skull from above shows that it possesses sinuous margins, with well-defined curves creating a wavy outline. This is especially prominent in the region where the premaxillary bones contact the maxillae, which serves to set Paranasuchus apart from taxa like Mourasuchus, Purussaurus, Acresuchus and even the extant broad-snouted caiman, all of which have much less pronounced "festooning". The external nares face upward and are described as rounded, set apart from those of Mourasuchus by being not as wide and from those of Purussaurus due to not being as elongated. They also differ from those of modern caimans, in which the nares are shifted further forward. The nares are entirely surrounded by the premaxillary bones, preventing the nasal bones from extending into the opening as they do in modern caimans and Acresuchus.

A major feature that separates Paranasuchus from Paranacaiman can be observed in the region where the prefrontals contact the frontal bone. In Paranacaiman this region bears a prominent V-shaped shelf which is absent in Paranasuchus. The part of the frontal bone known as the interorbital bridge, the section located between the two eyesockets, is wider than it is long, something otherwise only seen in species of Purussaurus amongst caimans. Unlike in Paranacaiman, the edges of the skull table converge with each other toward the front of the skull and the supraoccipital bone is not nearly as sunken in, but rather aligns well with the inclination of the neighbouring squamosals. The supratemporal fenestra, two openings in the skull roof, are not quite circular in shape rather than elongated. The ornamentation of the skull roof, which is the pattern of pits in the bone's surface, is another feature that distinguishes Paranasuchus from contemporary caimans. Specifically, in Paranasuchus the ornamentation primarily consists of interconnected ridges that create a pattern of irregular and mostly incomplete cells, whereas in Paranacaiman the ornamentation is best described as a pattern of very well-defined cells and rounded pits.

== Phylogeny ==
Although initially described as a species of Caiman, later studies have repeatedly shown that Paranasuchus was only distantly related to the modern genus. One example of this can be found in the 2021 study by Jonathan P. Rio and Phillip D. Mannion, who recovered Paranasuchus (at that point still known as Caiman gasparinae) outside of the clade Jacarea and more closely related to the flat-snouted caiman Mourasuchus alongside the holotype of Paranacaiman (then under the name Caiman lutescens). The 2024 study by Bona and colleagues is very similar in regards to the closest relatives of the animal, although the clade's position among caimans is shifted. Like in the study by Rio and Mannion, Paranasuchus was found to be most closely related to Paranacaiman as well as the various species of Mourasuchus, with which they form a monophyletic group. However, in the more recent study these animals further clade with other large-bodied caimans of the Miocene, Purussaurus and Acresuchus, with the latter two thus falling outside of Jacarea.

- Caimaninae
  - - †Ceratosuchus
    - - †Wannaganosuchus
      - - †Stangerochampsa
        - †Brachychampsa
  - - †Gnatusuchus
    - - †Kuttanacaiman
      - - †Globidentosuchus
        - - - †Caiman lutescens
            - - †Caiman gasparinae
              - †Mourasuchus
          - Jacarea
            - Caiman yacare (Yacare caiman)
            - - - †Acresuchus
                - †Purussaurus
              - - - †Caiman wannlangstoni
                  - †UCMP 39978
                - - - †Caiman brevirostris
                    - Melanosuchus niger (Black caiman)
                  - - Caiman latirostris (Broad-snouted caiman)
                    - - - †Bottosaurus
                        - †Protocaiman
                        - †Necrosuchus
                      - - Caiman crocodilus (Spectacled caiman)
                        - - †Tsoabichi
                          - - Paleosuchus palpebrosus (Cuvier's dwarf caiman)
                            - Paleosuchus trigonatus (Smooth-fronted caiman)

- Crown‑Caimaninae
  - - †Kuttanacaiman
    - - - †Paleosuchus sp.
        - Paleosuchus trigonatus (Smooth-fronted caiman)
        - Paleosuchus palpebrosus (Cuvier's dwarf caiman)
      - - †Tsoabichi
        - †Bottosaurus
  - - Jacarea
      - - Caiman crocodilus (Spectacled caiman)
        - Caiman yacare (Yacare caiman)
      - - †Caiman wannlangstoni
        - †Centenariosuchus
        - Melanosuchus niger (Black caiman)
        - †La Venta caiman
        - †Caiman brevirostris
        - Caiman latirostris (Broad-snouted caiman)
        - †MACN-Pv 5416
    - - - - †Acresuchus
          - †Purussaurus neivensis
        - - †Purussaurus mirandain
          - †Purussaurus brasiliensis
      - - †Paranacaiman
        - †Paranasuchus gasparinae
        - †Mourasuchus

== Paleobiology ==
Fossils of Paranasuchus have only been recovered from Argentina's Ituzaingó Formation. Like other localities that preserve a glimpse into the Miocene fauna of South America, the Ituzaingó Formation is rich in crocodilian fossils. In addition to Paranasuchus this includes the large-bodied caiman Paranacaiman, the flat-headed Mourasuchus, Caiman australis as well as the gharial Gryposuchus. The presence of the enormous Purussaurus has also been reported in older publications, but in their 2024 study Bona and colleagues cast doubt over this identification given the very limited material. What sets this southern crocodilian fauna apart from those found further north, such as those of the Urumaco Formation in Venezuela and Brazil's Solimões Formation, is the fact that Ituzaingó preserves a much higher amount of generalist caimans (Paranacaiman, Paranasuchus and Caiman australis) while the northern localities preserve a diverse assemblage of smaller hard-prey specialists.
