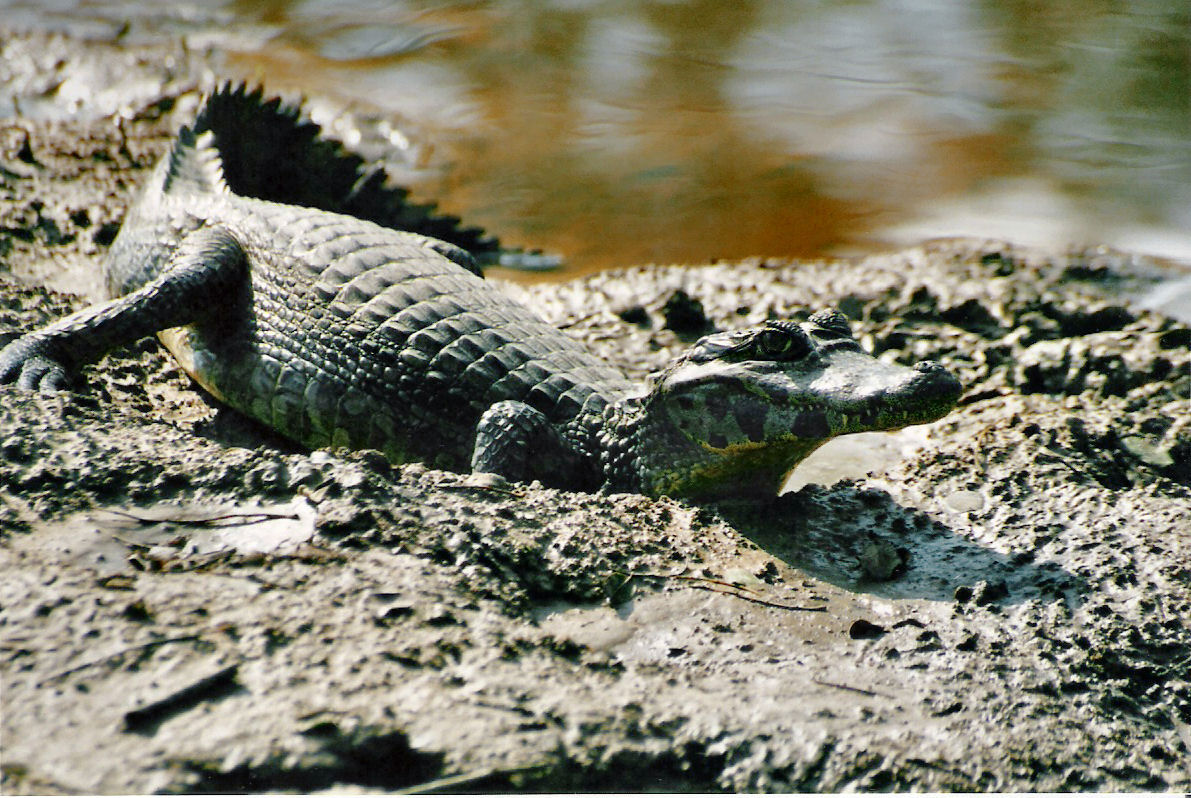
- Yacare caiman, Caiman yacare

Scientific classification
- Kingdom: Animalia
- Phylum: Chordata
- Class: Reptilia
- Order: Crocodylia
- Family: Alligatoridae
- Subfamily: Caimaninae
- Clade: Jacarea
- Genus: Caiman; Spix, 1825

Type species
- Caiman crocodilus Linnaeus, 1758

Species
- Caiman crocodilus; Caiman latirostris; Caiman yacare; †Caiman australis; †Caiman brevirostris; †Caiman praecursor; †Caiman wannlangstoni

Synonyms
- Jacaretinga Spix, 1825; Champsa Wagler, 1830; Jacare Gray, 1844

= Caiman (genus) =

Caiman Temporal range: Middle Miocene–Present, 16–0 Ma

Genus of reptiles

Caiman is a genus of caimans within the alligatorid subfamily Caimaninae. They inhabit Central and South America. They are relatively small sized crocodilians, with all species reaching lengths of only a couple of meters and weighing 6 to 40 kg (13 to 88 lb) on average.

== Classification ==
The genus Caiman contains three extant (living) species: the Broad-snouted caiman (Caiman latirostris), the Spectacled caiman (Caiman crocodilus), and the Yacare caiman (Caiman yacare). There are also several extinct fossil species in the genus - possibly up to eight species. The genus Caiman belongs to the caiman subfamily Caimaninae, and the relationships of the living species of caimans can be shown in the cladogram below, based on molecular DNA-based phylogenetic studies:

- Alligatoridae
  - Caimaninae
    - - Paleosuchus palpebrosus Cuvier's dwarf caiman
      - Paleosuchus trigonatus Smooth-fronted caiman
    - Jacarea
      - - - Caiman crocodilus Spectacled caiman
          - Caiman yacare Yacare caiman
        - Caiman latirostris Broad-snouted caiman
      - Melanosuchus niger Black caiman
  - Alligatorinae
    - Alligator sinensis Chinese alligator
    - Alligator mississippiensis American alligator

The below detailed cladogram of Caimaninae includes extinct fossil species, based on morphological analysis:

- Caimaninae
  - †Culebrasuchus mesoamericanus
  - - †Gnatusuchus pebasensis
    - - †Globidentosuchus brachyrostris
      - - - †Eocaiman palaeocenicus
          - - †Eocaiman itaboraiensis
            - †Eocaiman cavernensis
        - - †Kuttanacaiman iquitosensis
          - - - - †Bottosaurus harlani
                - †Tsoabichi greenriverensis
              - - Paleosuchus trigonatus Smooth-fronted caiman
                - Paleosuchus palpebrosus Cuvier's dwarf caiman
            - - - †Paranasuchus gasparinae
                - - - †Mourasuchus amazonensis
                    - †Mourasuchus pattersoni
                  - - †Mourasuchus atopus
                    - †Mourasuchus arendsi
              - Jacarea
                - †Necrosuchus ionensis
                - †UCMP 39978
                - †Caiman wannlangstoni
                - †Centenariosuchus gilmorei
                - †Caiman brevirostris
                - Melanosuchus niger Black caiman
                - Caiman latirostris Broad-snouted caiman
                - Caiman yacare Yacare caiman
                - Caiman crocodilus Spectacled caiman
                - - †Acresuchus pachytemporalis
                  - - †Purussaurus neivensis
                    - †Purussaurus mirandai
                    - †Purussaurus brasiliensis

== Characteristics ==
Caimans are similar to alligators in morphology but differ in having bony plates, known as osteoderms, buried in the skin on the underside. The broad-snouted and spectacled caimans are characterised by having a bony ridge across the bridge of the nose just below the eyes.

=== Size ===
The yacare caiman is the largest species in the genus, attaining an average adult length of 2.5 to 3 m (8.2 to 9.8 ft), the spectacled caiman reaches 2 to 2.5 m (6.6 to 8.2 ft), with the female rather smaller, and the broad-snouted caiman is the smallest, more typically measuring 1.8 to 2 m (5.9 to 6.6 ft) for males and 1.2 to 1.4 m (3.9 to 4.6 ft) for females.

== Distribution and habitat ==
This genus is present in Central and South America. The spectacled caiman (Caiman crocodilus) occurs in Central America and parts of the northern half of South America at altitudes of up to about 800 m (2,600 ft). It is usually found in freshwater, but also visits the brackish water of estuaries on occasion. It has varying habitats including wetlands and slow-moving rivers and streams. The yacare caiman (Caiman yacare) occurs in the central part of southern South America, particularly in the Pantanal region, the largest tropical wetland area in the world, which is flooded seasonally by the Paraguay River. The broad-snouted caiman (Caiman latirostris) occurs in central and eastern South America, its range including southeastern Brazil, Bolivia, Paraguay, Uruguay and northern Argentina, within the drainage systems of the Paraná, Paraguay, Uruguay and São Francisco Rivers.

== Behaviour ==
Caimans spend much of their time basking on mudflats or in sunlit, muddy jungle streams. In the dry season, large numbers may accumulate in pools as the surrounding land dries up. They can move on land with some rapidity, hiss when disturbed, and young individuals can inflate themselves before opening their jaws aggressively. Caimans do not usually attack humans but domestic livestock are at risk. They seize their prey and drag it underwater to drown it. They may observe a potential prey, swim away, submerge and return to attack the floating bird or drinking mammal from underwater. Juvenile caimans feed on crustaceans and molluscs while larger animals feed on amphibians, fish, birds, mammals and reptiles.

A caiman nest is a mound of vegetation and mud consolidated by the female by lying on it. She then digs a hole in it and buries a few dozen eggs in it. When these hatch, the juveniles use their egg teeth to break their way out. They are about 23 cm (9 in) long at hatching, growing to 60 cm (24 in) by a year later. They look like miniature versions of their parents but have relatively shorter snouts and larger eyes.

== Taxonomy ==
=== Extant species ===
Genus Caiman – Spix, 1825 – three species
Common name	Scientific name and subspecies	Range	Size and ecology	IUCN status and estimated population
Spectacled caiman	Caiman crocodilus Linnaeus, 1758 Four subspecies: C. c. apaporiensis (Medem, 1955); C. c. chiapasius (Bocourt, 1876); C. c. crocodilus (Linnaeus, 1758); C. c. fuscus (Cope, 1868)	Central and South America	Size: Habitat: forests, inland bodies of fresh water (such as wetlands and rivers), grasslands, shrublands, and savannas Diet: crabs, fish, small mammals, amphibians and snails.	LC
Broad-snouted caiman	Caiman latirostris (Daudin, 1801)	Brazil, northern Argentina, Uruguay, Paraguay, and Bolivia	Size: Habitat: freshwater wetlands, including floodplains, marshes, swamps, mangrove forests, as well as various streams, rivers, lakes or ponds Diet: small invertebrates it can find, such as beetles or arachnids. Small mammals, birds, larger fish, amphibians, and reptiles.	LC
Yacare caiman	Caiman yacare Daudin,, 1802	northeastern Argentina, Uruguay, southeastern Peru, eastern Bolivia, central/southwest Brazil, and the rivers of Paraguay	Size: Habitat: lakes, rivers, and wetlands Diet: aquatic animals, such as snails, and occasionally land vertebrates	LC

=== Fossil species ===
Species known only from fossil remains:

- †Caiman australis Bravard 1858 - Ituzaingó Formation, Argentina
- †Caiman brevirostris Souza Filho 1987 - Solimões Formation, Brazil and Urumaco Formation, Venezuela
- †Caiman praecursor Rusconi 1933 - Ituzaingó Formation, Argentina
- †Caiman wannlangstoni Salas Gismondi et al. 2015 - Honda Group, Colombia, Pebas Formation, Peru and Urumaco Formation, Venezuela

Caiman venezuelensis from the Pleistocene epoch is probably a junior synonym of the spectacled caiman. Some fossil taxa previously included within the genus Caiman now belong to separate extinct genera, including Acresuchus and Paranasuchus.
