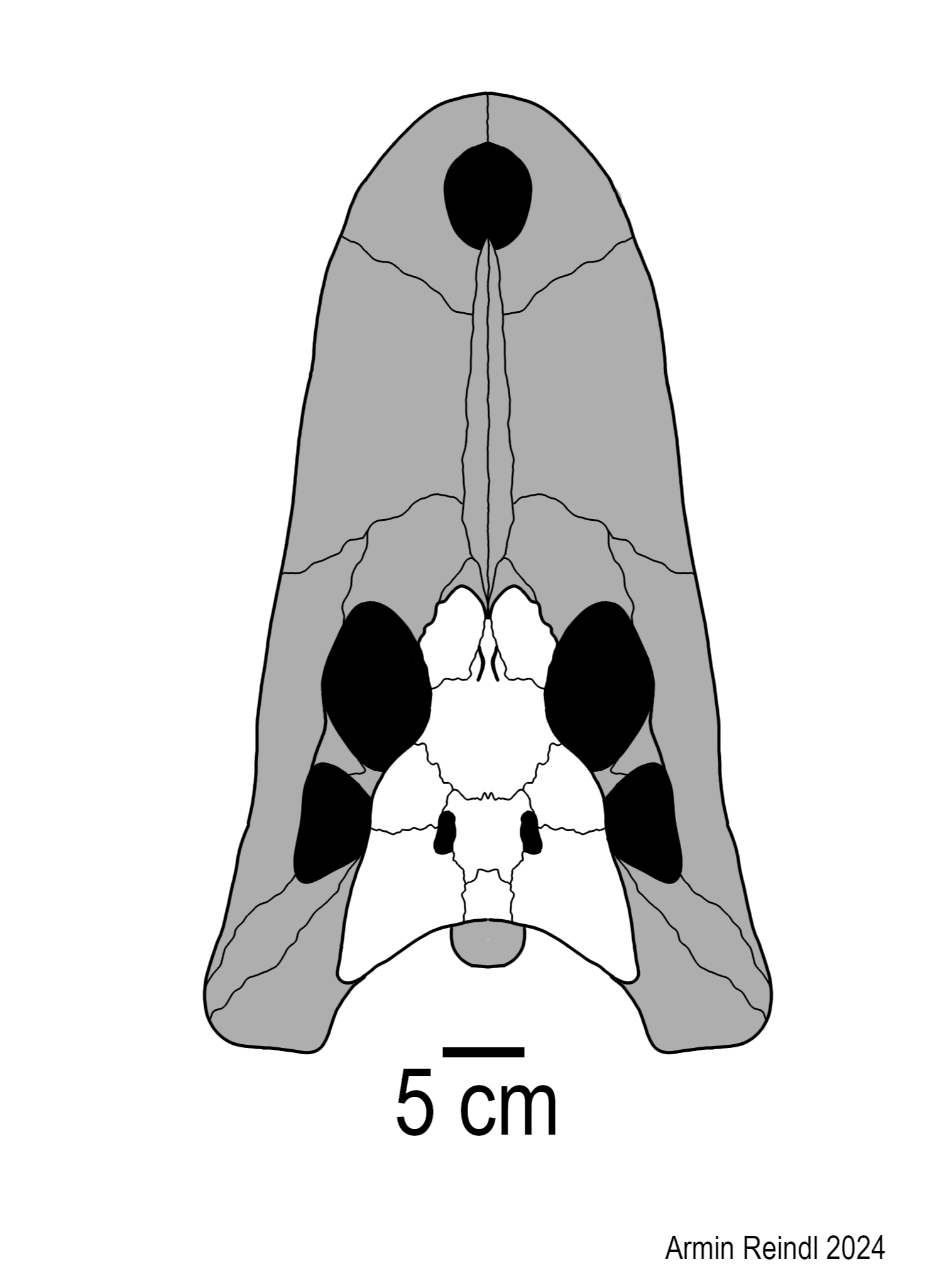
- Skull reconstruction of the holotype of Paranacaiman bravardi.

Scientific classification
- Kingdom: Animalia
- Phylum: Chordata
- Class: Reptilia
- Clade: Archosauria
- Order: Crocodilia
- Family: Alligatoridae
- Subfamily: Caimaninae
- Genus: †Paranacaiman; Bona et al., 2024

Type species
- Paranacaiman bravardi Bona et al., 2024

= Paranacaiman =

Paranacaiman Temporal range: Late Miocene

Genus of caiman

Paranacaiman is an extinct genus of large caiman from the Late Miocene Ituzaingó Formation of Argentina. The holotype, a skull table, was part of the hypodigm for "Caiman lutescens", which was later found to be a nomen dubium. Since a lectotype had been erected for "C. lutescens", the skull table was not name-bearing and was thus used to erect Paranacaiman. The genus is monotypic, meaning it only contains a single species: Paranacaiman bravardi.

== History and naming ==
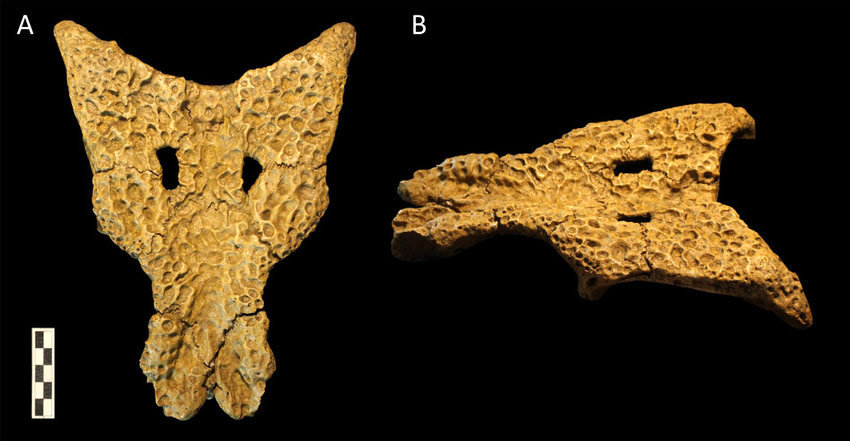
MACN PV 13551 is a well preserved skull table initually used in the hypodigm of Caiman lutescens and would later become the holotype of Paranacaiman.

The type specimen of Paranacaiman is the isolated skull table designated MACN-Pv 13551, which has historically been tied to the now dubious taxon "Caiman lutescens". "Caiman lutescens" was described in 1912 by Italian paleontologist Gaetano Rovereto as "Alligator lutescens" on the basis of various fragmentary skull and postcranial remains found within the layers of the Ituzaingó Formation in Argentina. However, Rovereto did not designate a holotype specimen among his finds, rendering the entire collection of bones including the skull table MACN-Pv 13551 the syntype of his species. In 1933 an attempt was made to bring better stability to the taxon, with a partial snout being elected to become the lectotype of the taxon. Subsequently, the validity of the taxon rested on this specimen being diagnostic while the remaining fossils of the syntype were no longer fundamental to the definition of the species. "Alligator lutescens" eventually came to be considered a species of the genus Caiman by Wann Langston, with some authors even declaring it a synonym of Caiman latirostris.

in 2012, Paula Bona and colleagues argued that the lectotype was indeed referrable to Caiman latirostris, but argued for the validity of "Caiman lutescens" by erroneously considering the diagnostic skull table the holotype. Bona would return to the matter in 2024 with another publication, amending the mistake of considering the skull table the holotype. They reinforce the notion that the "Caiman lutescens" was a nomen dubium, although rather than assigning the lectotype to Caiman latirostris they highlight that the lack of diagnostic features means it cannot be identified to anything more specific than Jacarea. Since the diagnostic and distinct skull table was no longer tied to any specific name, the genus and species Paranacaiman bravardi was coined for it. In addition to the holotype, another skull table and two isolated frontals were also assigned to the taxon. There's the possibility of a third skull table belonging to Paranacaiman, but said specimen belonged to a juvenile that cannot be confidently assigned to the genus.

The name Paranacaiman means "Caiman from Paraná" in reference to the banks of the Paraná River where the fossil material was discovered. The species name meanwhile honors Auguste Bravard, a French geologist and paleontologist who was the first to study the Cenozoic fossils of the region.

== Description ==
Paranacaiman is only known from very limited skull material, chiefly a largely complete skull table and the still attached prefrontal bones. The prefrontals possess rounded edges, both those facing outwards as well as the medial margins, which sets them apart from any modern caiman species. The paired elements slightly contact each other along the midline and connect with the frontal bone, with which they form a prominent V-shaped shelf not seen in other large contemporary caimans like Paranasuchus. Typically in modern caimans the frontal has a long anterior process that often extends forward beyond the beginning of the eyesockets, however, in Paranacaiman the anterior process is very short, only beginning behind the orbital margins.

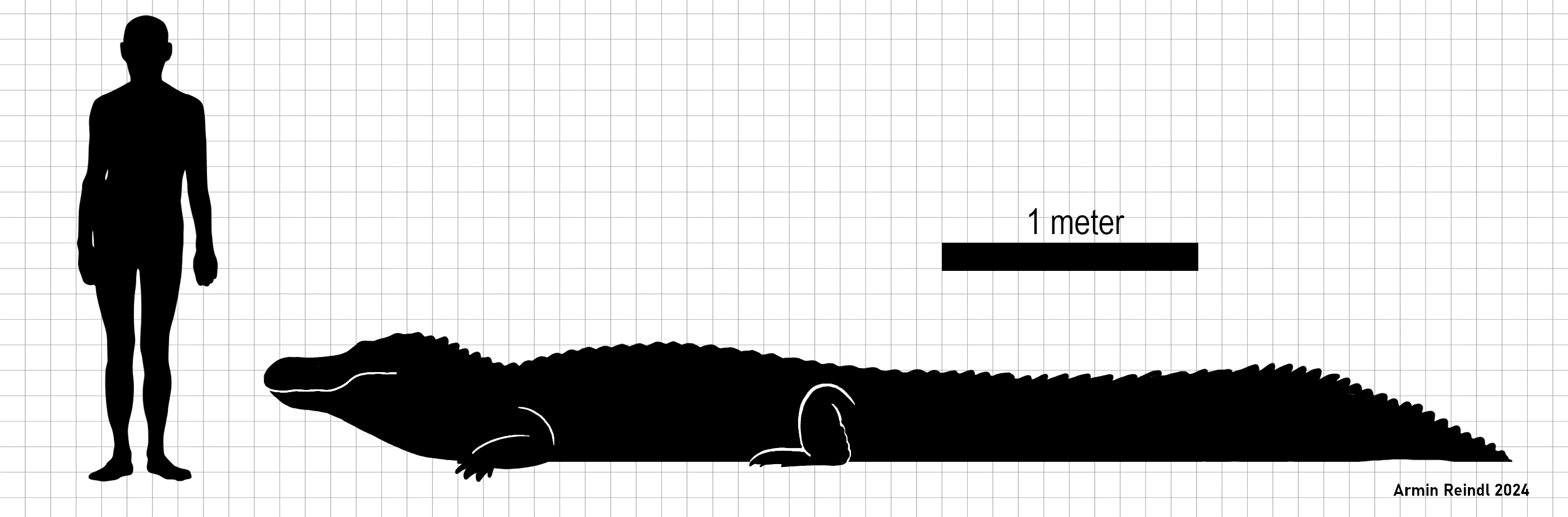
Though no precise estimates are given, Paranacaiman is described as a "huge" animal.

The skull table of Paranacaiman is noted for the fact that the edge at the back of the skull is concave to a point that it's almost V-shaped. This already distinguishes it from most crown caimans with the exception of some individuals of Acresuchus as well as some black caimans. The rims of the eyesockets are well developed and raised, creating a prominent groove that stretches across the skull table. Paranacaiman lacks the well-developed squamosal "horns" most prominently seen in Acresuchus but also present in Purussaurus and Mourasuchus. As with most crocodilians, two openings can be seen piercing the skull table, the supratemporal fenestra, though while they tend to be round to sub-circular in most modern caimans, they are very narrow and small in Paranacaiman.

Broadly speaking, the upper surface of the skull table is formed by five bones: the frontal bone that extends between the eyes and connects to the prefrontals, two postorbital bones on either side forming the anterior corners of the element, the paired squamosals that project backwards and form the posterior corner, giving the skull table its V-shaped indentation, the singular parietal bone which in the case of Paranacaiman is entirely enclosed and the supraoccipital bone that forms the central part of the hind-most edge of the element. The squamosal bones that form the edges of the skull table are unassuming and do not form prominent swollen crests as seen in Acresuchus, Purussaurus and Mourasuchus. The supraoccipital is a prominent element of the skull table, well exposed and responsible for the parietal bone not contributing to the edges of the skull table. Notably, its deeply concave and depressed relative to the surrounding squamosals and parietal, which forms a continuation of the groove that stretches across the skull table. While a concave skull table is seen in some modern caimans, this effect is usually achieved by the fact that the squamosal bones are inclined, while this is not the case in Paranacaiman.

=== Size ===
Paranacaiman is described as "huge" by Bona and colleagues, but the type description offers no precise size estimates.

== Phylogeny ==
Phylogenetic analysis has recovered Paranacaiman as forming a clade with the contemporary Paranasuchus as well as several large-bodied Miocene caimans, namely Mourasuchus, Purussaurus and Acresuchus. Within this clade, the two Parana species form a trichotomy with Mourasuchus, while Purussaurus and Acresuchus were recovered as each others closest relatives. Overall, this group seems to be the sister clade to Jacarea, the group that includes the modern genera Caiman and Melanosuchus as well as their closest extinct relatives.

- Crown‑Caimaninae
  - - †Kuttanacaiman
    - - - †Paleosuchus sp.
        - Paleosuchus trigonatus (Smooth-fronted caiman)
        - Paleosuchus palpebrosus (Cuvier's dwarf caiman)
      - - †Tsoabichi
        - †Bottosaurus
  - - Jacarea
      - - Caiman crocodilus (Spectacled caiman)
        - Caiman yacare (Yacare caiman)
      - - †Caiman wannlangstoni
        - †Centenariosuchus
        - Melanosuchus niger (Black caiman)
        - †La Venta caiman
        - †Caiman brevirostris
        - Caiman latirostris (Broad-snouted caiman)
        - †MACN-Pv 5416
    - - - - †Acresuchus
          - †Purussaurus neivensis
        - - †Purussaurus mirandain
          - †Purussaurus brasiliensis
      - - †Paranacaiman bravardi
        - †Paranasuchus
        - †Mourasuchus

The recovery of Paranacaiman as a close relative to Mourasuchus and Paranasuchus supports the results previously recovered by Rio and Mannion in 2021. In their study, they scored Caiman lutescens based on the holotype of Paranacaiman and found it to clade with Caiman gasparinae and Mourasuchus much like Bona and colleagues would in 2024. However, the two studies differ in that Bona and colleagues found them to clade with Purussaurus and Acresuchus, whereas Rio and Mannion placed the latter within Jacarea while the former were merely the sister group to crown caimans.

== Paleobiology ==
Paranacaiman is exclusively known from the Late Miocene Ituzaingó Formation of Paraná, Argentina. Like other Miocene localities of South America, the Ituzaingó Formation preserves a high diversity of crocodilians, including the gulp-feeding Mourasuchus, the narrow-snouted gharial Gryposuchus and the large macropredator Purussaurus, although the presence of Purussaurus has been called into question by Bona and colleagues. A key difference between the Ituzaingó and more northern localities like those of the Urumaco and Solimões Formations concerns both the absence of durophageous caimans (hard-shelled prey specialists) and the abundance of generalists. The latter are represented not only by Paranacaiman but also by Paranasuchus and Caiman australis.
