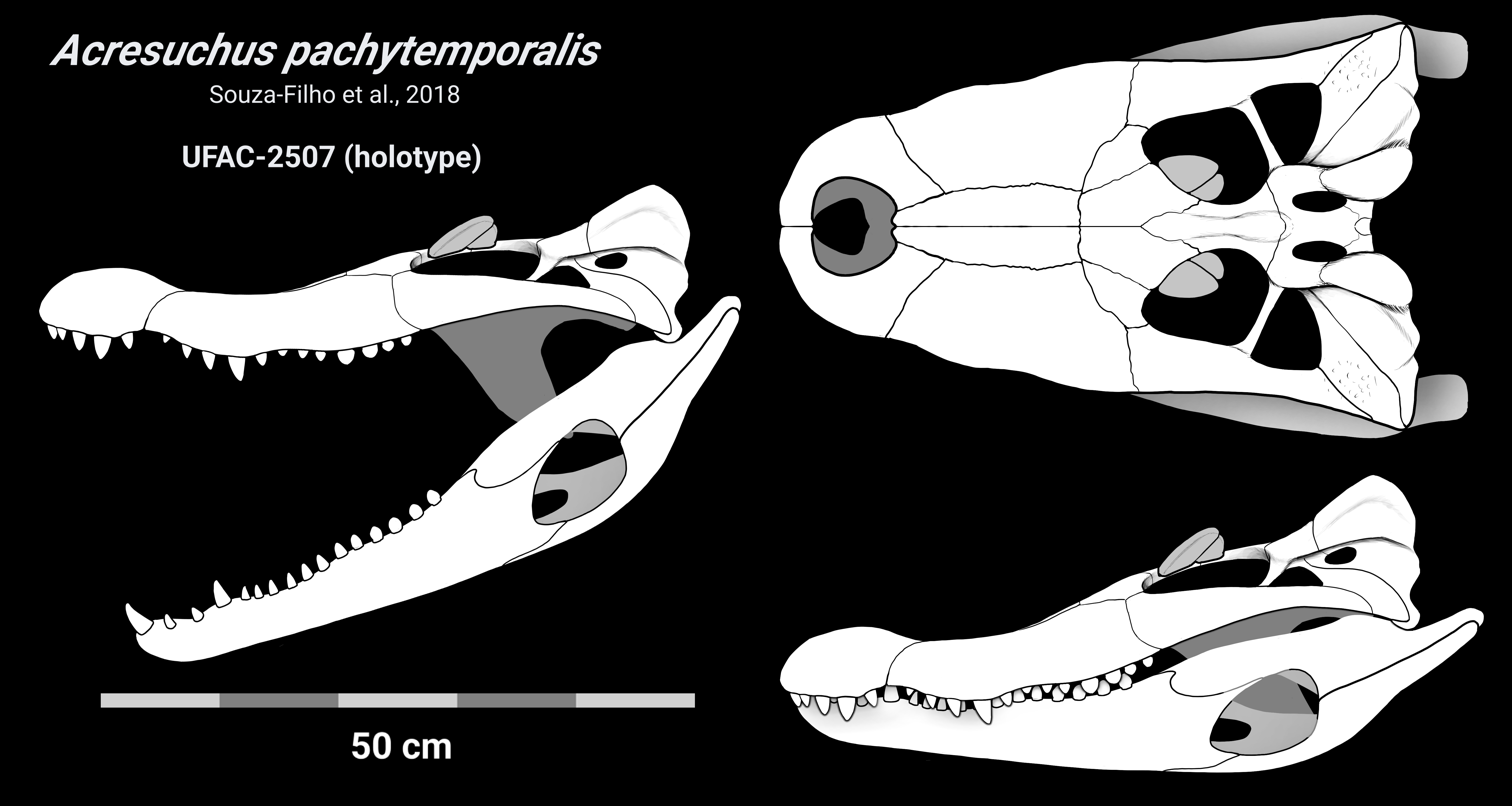
- Diagram of the holotype skull

Scientific classification
- Kingdom: Animalia
- Phylum: Chordata
- Class: Reptilia
- Clade: Archosauria
- Order: Crocodilia
- Family: Alligatoridae
- Subfamily: Caimaninae
- Clade: Jacarea
- Genus: †Acresuchus; Souza-Filho et al., 2018

Type species
- †Acresuchus pachytemporalis Souza-Filho et al., 2018

= Acresuchus =

Acresuchus Temporal range: Late Miocene, 11.62–5.33 Ma

Genus of extinct caiman from the Late Miocene

Acresuchus ("Acre crocodile") is an extinct monospecific genus of medium-sized caiman from the Late Miocene of western Brazil and Venezuela. The genus contains a single species, Acresuchus pachytemporalis. Acresuchus is a close relative of the giant caiman Purussaurus.

== Description ==
The hypodigm of Acresuchus consists of the holotype, UFAC-2507, a nearly complete skull, and several referred specimens, most found in Niteroi, located in the Solimões Formation in Acre. Acresuchus takes its name from the state it was found in (Acre), while the species name pachytemporalis refers to the extreme thickening of the squamosal bones in the holotype. Another specimen, MCNUSB-PB-02FU-RS43, a skull fragment, was found in the middle member of the Urumaco Formation in Venezuela.

According to the describing authors, Acresuchus is a "caimanine with a medium-sized body, teeth with smooth (non-serrated) carinae, orbits large in comparison with other caimanines, having roughly straight margins that are larger than the infratemporal fenestrae, circular external naris, posterior margin of the skull table transversely straight to slightly concave, posterolateral margin of squamosal upturned throughout the entire dorsal lateral margin with a dorsoventral expansion in the posterior portion of the eminence," with the last trait being a unique trait within the subfamily Caimaninae.

The holotype of Acresuchus has an estimated skull length of 51.5 cm (20.3 in), smaller than all three species of Purussaurus, which suggests that Acresuchus may have represented a transitional form between the traditional caiman body plan and that of Purussaurus. Acresuchus lacked an enlarged external nostril, which in Purussaurus is hypothesized to reduce stress when biting, thus creating a more powerful bite. However, Acresuchus has small depressions in the posterior portions of the maxillae, similar to the deep excavations found in Purussaurus. These depressions may increase with body size in the Acresuchus-Purussaurus clade.

Acresuchus shares traits with Purussaurus that may have been adaptations to large body size, such as large supratemporal fenestrae. These provided quicker capture of prey and better thermoregulation.

A 2022 study estimated the body size of Acresuchus, Purussaurus, and another extinct caimanine, Mourasuchus using skull width and the dorsocranial length of the skull, determining that dorsocranial length is affected by changes in the skull throughout growth. Therefore, the authors used their estimates derived from skull width, estimating the length and mass of Acresuchus as 3.744 metres (12.28 ft) and 260.3 kilograms (574 lb), respectively, using ordinary least squares regression, while the estimates made utilizing a phylogenetic least squares regression recovered estimates of 3.401 metres (11.16 ft) and 225.6 kilograms (497 lb). The authors of the study acknowledged the lower results of the phylogenetic approach, stating that it may be due to a weaker correlation between skull width and body size compared to OLS.

== Classification ==
The describing authors of Acresuchus entered the data gleaned from its specimens into a phylogenetic analysis to test its affinities. The analysis found it to be a member of Caimaninae closely related to Purussaurus, which was confirmed by subsequent studies. The result of the initial analysis is shown in the cladogram below.

- Caimaninae
  - Culebrasuchus mesoamericanus
  - - Gnatusuchus pebasensis
    - - Globidentosuchus brachyrostris
      - - - Eocaiman palaeocenicus
          - - Eocaiman itaboraiensis
            - Eocaiman cavernensis
        - - Kuttanacaiman iquitosensis
          - - Caiman gasparinae
            - Necrosuchus ionensis
            - Tsoabichi greenriverensis
            - - Paleosuchus palpebrosus Smooth-fronted caiman
              - Paleosuchus trigonatus Cuvier's dwarf caiman
            - - - Mourasuchus pattersoni
                - Mourasuchus amazonensis
              - - Mourasuchus atopus
                - Mourasuchus arendsi
            - - - Acresuchus pachytemporalis
                - - Purussaurus neivensis
                  - Purussaurus mirandai
                  - Purussaurus brasiliensis
              - - Centenariosuchus gilmorei
                - Jacarea
                  - UCMP 39978
                  - Melanosuchus fisheri
                  - Melanosuchus niger Black caiman
                  - Caiman wannlangstoni
                  - Caiman brevirostris
                  - Caiman latirostris Broad-snouted caiman
                  - - Caiman crocodilus Spectacled caiman
                    - Caiman yacare Yacare caiman

== Paleoecology ==
Acresuchus shares many features with the living black caiman, including size, which suggests it would have a similar diet. If this assumption is correct, juvenile Acresuchus would have preyed on small invertebrates, with adults feeding on fish and small to medium-sized mammals. The teeth at the back of the skull in Acresuchus are blunt, indicating that it may have also eaten hard-shelled animals.
