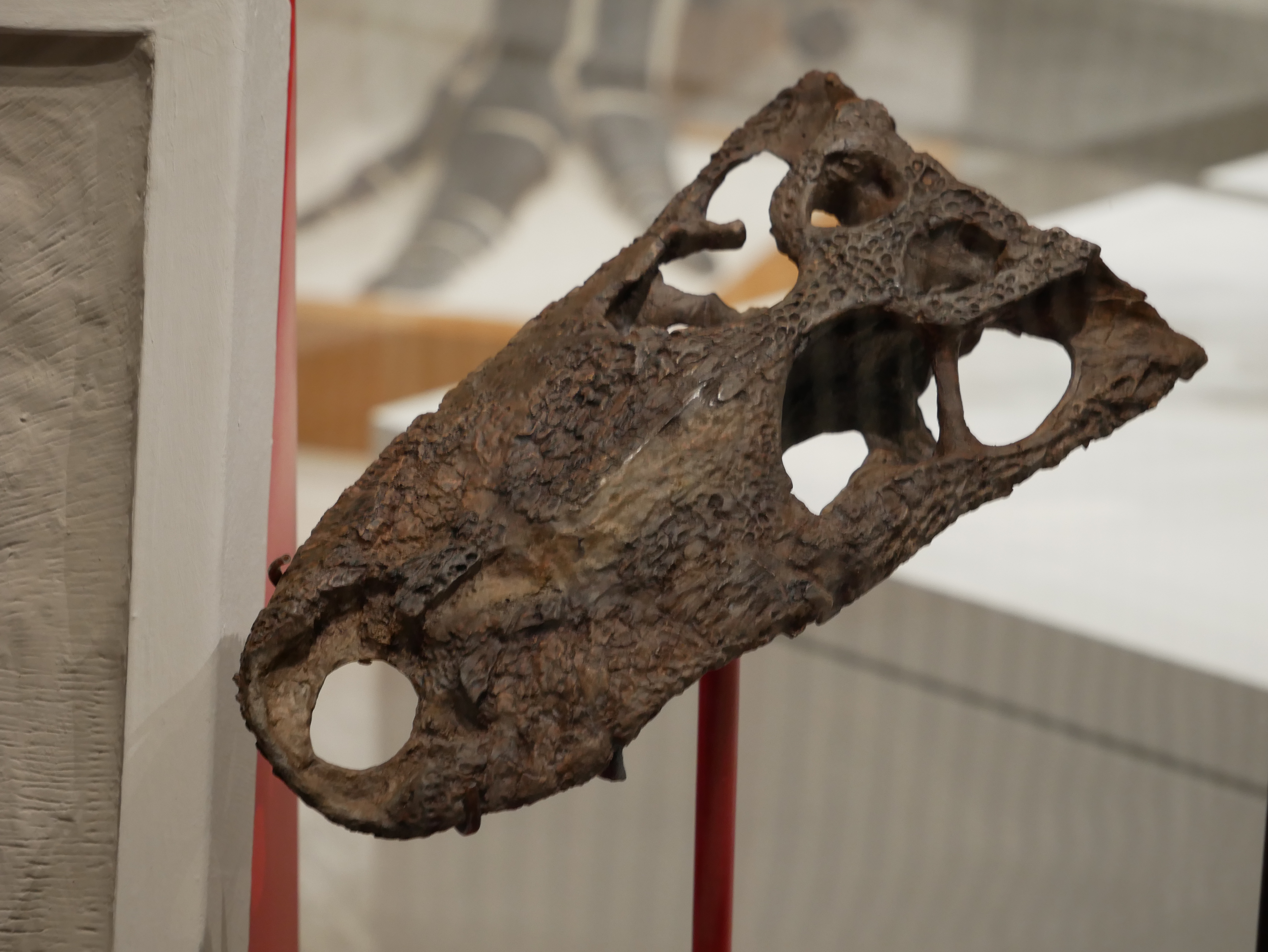
- Skull at the Yale Peabody Museum

Scientific classification
- Kingdom: Animalia
- Phylum: Chordata
- Class: Reptilia
- Clade: Archosauria
- Order: Crocodilia
- Family: Alligatoridae
- Genus: †Albertochampsa; Erickson, 1972

Type species
- †Albertochampsa langstoni Erickson, 1972

= Albertochampsa =

Albertochampsa Temporal range: 76.5–75 Ma

Extinct genus of reptiles

Albertochampsa is an extinct genus of alligatorid (possibly a stem-caiman or a basal alligatorine) from the Late Cretaceous of Alberta. It was named in 1972 by Bruce Erickson, and the type species is A. langstoni. It is known from a skull from the Campanian-age Dinosaur Park Formation, where it was rare; Leidyosuchus is the most commonly found crocodilian at the Park. The skull of Albertochampsa was only about 21 cm long (8.3 in).

== Phylogeny ==
Albertochampsa is a member of the family Alligatoridae, which includes the extant (living) alligators and caimans, although it is disputed whether Albertochampsa is more closely related to the alligators or the caimans. The below cladogram from a 2018 study shows Albertochampsa as more closely related to the caimans in the subfamily Caimaninae.

- Alligatoridae (crown group)
  - Alligatorinae (stem-based group)
  - Caimaninae (stem-based group)
    - - Stangerochampsa†
      - Albertochampsa†
      - Brachychampsa†
    - - Protocaiman†
      - - Gnatusuchus†
        - - Globidentosuchus†
          - - - Eocaiman†
              - Notocaiman†
            - - Kuttanacaiman†
              - - - Purussaurus†
                  - Mourasuchus†
                - crown group caimans
                  - - Necrosuchus†
                    - Tsoabichi†
                    - - Paleosuchus trigonatus Smooth-fronted caiman
                      - Paleosuchus palpebrosus Cuvier's dwarf caiman
                  - - Centenariosuchus†
                    - - - Caiman latirostris Broad-snouted caiman
                        - Melanosuchus niger Black caiman
                      - - - Caiman yacare Yacare caiman
                          - Caiman crocodilus Spectacled caiman
                        - - Caiman brevirostris†
                          - - La Venta Caiman†
                            - Caiman wannlangstoni†

The Late Cretaceous taxa Stangerochampsa, Brachychampsa and Albertochampsa have been previously referred to as stem-group caimans, but Walter et al. (2022) recovered them as the basalmost alligatorines based on phylogenetic analysis and claimed that the earliest definitive stem-group caimans are known from the earliest Paleocene.
