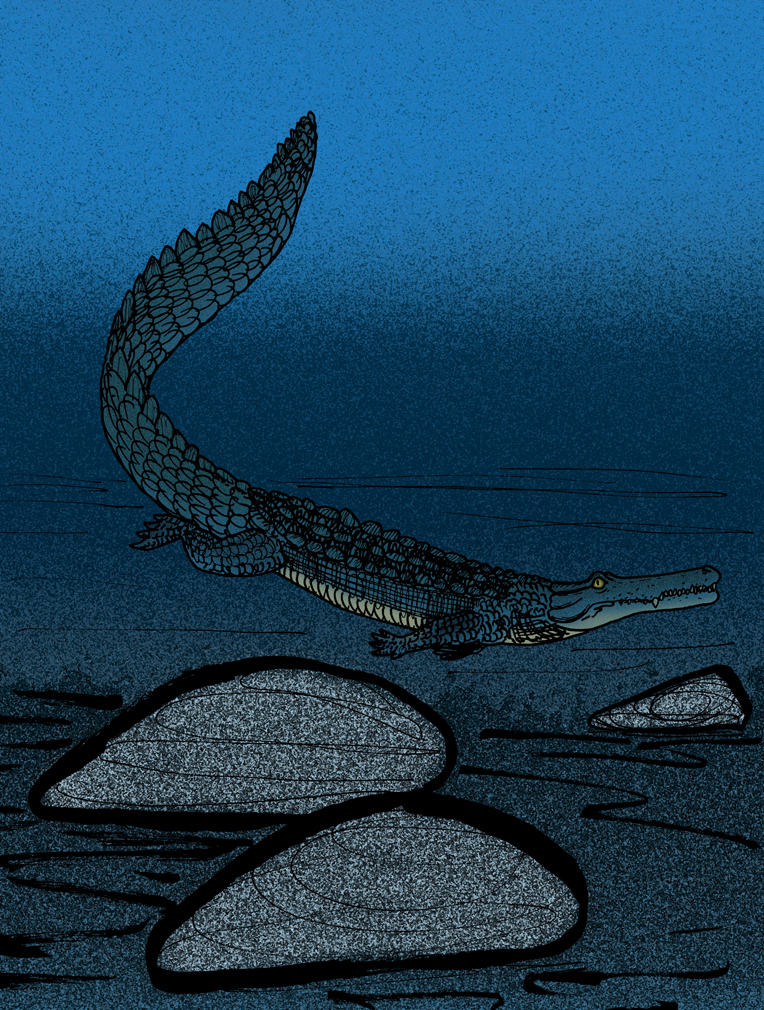
- Artist's restoration

Scientific classification
- Kingdom: Animalia
- Phylum: Chordata
- Class: Reptilia
- Clade: Archosauria
- Order: Crocodilia
- Superfamily: Alligatoroidea
- Family: Alligatoridae
- Subfamily: Caimaninae
- Clade: Jacarea
- Genus: †Necrosuchus; Simpson, 1937

Type species
- †Necrosuchus ionensis Simpson, 1937

= Necrosuchus =

Necrosuchus Temporal range: Paleocene (Peligran), 61.6–59.2 Ma

Extinct genus of reptiles

Necrosuchus is an extinct genus of caiman from modern day Argentina that lived during the Paleocene epoch (Danian or possibly Selandian age, about 60 million years ago). It inhabited the marine or fluvio-lacustrine environment of the Patagonian Salamanca Formation.

== History and naming ==
The fossil remains of Necrosuchus were unearthed on April 3, 1931 during the First Scarritt Expedition in the Argentinian Salamanca Formation and presented to American paleontologist Charles C. Mook. Mook however, busy with other research, was unable to describe the specimen himself. As an initial description was deemed vital to the works of several student researches at the time, Mook handed the specimen back to George G. Simpson for study. He eventually published his preliminary description in 1937, writing that his research "only carries this study as far as necessary" in the hopes of a more detailed description being later published by Mook himself. However this would not come to be and the postcranial was not described until 2012. Holotype AMNH 3219 consists of much of the postcranial anatomy alongside a right dentary and assorted cranial fragments not recognized as such in 1937. Although other material from Paleocene Patagonia shares similarities with Necrosuchus, none of it can be safely referred to the genus itself.

Simpson explains the meaning of the generic name as being a compound word of "nekros" meaning "dead," and "suchus" meaning crocodile. Simpson described how "a well-meaning lady asked us if it were dead", which inspired his choice of name. The specific name refers to the Las Violetas site: ion is "violet" in Latin.

== Description ==
The dentary teeth of Necrosuchus are more or less evenly spaced throughout the holotype, only the 12th and 13th teeth lying closer together than the others (however even then without being in direct contact). The upper margin of the jaw is notably concave between the 1st and 4th tooth and between the 4th and 13th, after which it remains straight. The teeth show very little differentiation from one another in morphology, however the difference in tooth size is striking and almost equal in its degree to that of extant genus Caiman. Although the degree of enlargement is similar, the distribution is not the same and more similar to that seen in Leidyosuchus (many of the species used for comparison being now considered Borealosuchus) according to Simpson. The first two teeth are of the same size, followed by a decrease in size for tooth three. The 4th dentary tooth is the largest of the lower jaw and followed by a series of noticeably smaller teeth (a similar condition is seen in extant caimans). Unlike in extant taxa however, the 13th tooth is enlarged to the point that it almost rivals the 4th dentary tooth in size, and the transition in size before and after it is much less abrupt. The 13th tooth's status of second largerst tooth in the dentary differentiates Necrosuchus from all other caimans other than Purussaurus brasiliensis and some species of Paleosuchus. Necrosuchus differs from Purussaurus through its slender mandibular ramus as well as the size of the first four dentary and from Paleosuchus through the anatomy of the atlantal ribs and the lack of mediolaterall compression on the posterior dentary teeth.

The postcranial remains include 4 dorsal vertebrae that were preserved in articulation. They are procoelous with rectangular neural spines and lacking their transverse processes due to preservation. At some point in the past, the vertebrae had been identified as dorsals 5 to 8, but the basis for this assignment is not known. However, the study by Brochu confirms that this assumption was correct based on the anatomy of the hypapophyseal keel. The last two dorsals are also preserved in articulation with the sacral vertebrae. The sutures of the dorsal and sacral neurocentrals are unfused and still open, suggesting that the animal was not yet fully grown by the time of its death. The pectoral girdle is largely preserved, with parts of both scapulacoracoids (missing the scapula blade), both humeri, ulnae and radii as well as one radiale. They largely resemble forelimbs of modern crocodilians. Both pelvic girdles are preserved, although one of the ilia is distorted, but the corresponding bone of the other side preserves its natural state. The blades of the pubis are less symmetrical than in modern crocs. The hindlimbs preserve the femur, tibia, parts of the fibula and various foot bones. Osteoderms were preserved but not in articulation.

== Phylogeny ==
Early analysis of Necrosuchus believed it to be a close relative of Leidyosuchus, which at the time was believed to be a crocodylid. Later research showed that Necrosuchus shows derived features of alligatoroids and more precisely caimanines. By the time Brochu described the postcrania of Necrosuchus, many species of Leidyosuchus originally used for comparison were reclassified as species of Borealosuchus. The postcranial material however differs significantly from Borealosuchus and shows further affinities with caimans. Following a taxonomic revision and amended diagnosis published in 2020, Cicade and colleagues recovered Necrosuchus as a derived member of Caimaninae nested within a large polytomy with most extant non-paleosuchus caimans and Purussaurus. This polytomy was a direct result of the inclusion of Necrosuchus and Centenariosuchus, and their removal resulted in a better resolved phylogenetic tree. Following a Pcr Prune analysis, two alternative placements of Necrosuchus recover it as either basal to the clade Jacarea or as basal to a clade comprising Jacarea and Acresuchus + Purussaurus. The below cladogram shows the results of the strict consensus phylogenetic analysis.

- Caimaninae
  - Culebrasuchus mesoamericanus
  - - Gnatusuchus pebasensis
    - - Globidentosuchus brachyrostris
      - - - Eocaiman palaeocenicus
          - - Eocaiman itaboraiensis
            - Eocaiman cavernensis
        - - Kuttanacaiman iquitosensis
          - - - - Bottosaurus harlani
                - Tsoabichi greenriverensis
              - - Paleosuchus trigonatus
                - Paleosuchus palpebrosus
            - - - Caiman gasparinae
                - - - Mourasuchus amazonensis
                    - Mourasuchus pattersoni
                  - - Mourasuchus atopus
                    - Mourasuchus arendsi
              - Jacarea
                - Necrosuchus ionensis
                - UCMP 39978
                - Caiman wannlangstoni
                - Centenariosuchus gilmorei
                - Caiman brevirostris
                - Melanosuchus niger
                - Caiman latirostris
                - Caiman yacare
                - Caiman crocodilus
                - - Acresuchus pachytemporalis
                  - - Purussaurus neivensis
                    - Purussaurus mirandai
                    - Purussaurus brasiliensis

The following morphological phylogenetic cladogram published by Rio and colleagues recovered a more resolved tree, with Necrosuchus clading alongside Bottosaurus from Cretaceous-Paleocene North America and Protocaiman, also from the Salamanca Formation.

- Caimaninae
  - - Ceratosuchus burdoschi
    - - Wannaganosuchus brachymanus
      - - Stangerochampsa mccabei
        - Brachychampsa montana
  - - Gnatusuchus pebasensis
    - - Kuttanacaiman iquitosensis
      - - Globidentosuchus brachyrostris
        - - - Caiman lutescens
            - - Caiman gasparinae
              - - Mourasuchus atopus
                - Mourasuchus arendsi
                - Mourasuchus amazonensis
          - Jacarea
            - Caiman yacare
            - - - Acresuchus pachytemporalis
                - - Purussaurus neivensis
                  - - Purussaurus mirandai
                    - Purussaurus brasiliensis
              - - - Caiman wannlangstoni
                  - UCMP 39978
                - - - Melanosuchus niger
                    - Caiman brevirostris
                  - - Caiman latirostris
                    - - - Protocaiman peligrensis
                        - Necrosuchus ionensis
                        - Bottosaurus harlani
                      - - Caiman crocodilus
                        - - Tsoabichi greenriverensis
                          - - Paleosuchus trigonatus
                            - Paleosuchus palpebrosus
