= Caiman brevirostris =

Caiman brevirostris Temporal range: Late Miocene, 11.6–5.3 Ma

Scientific classification
- Kingdom: Animalia
- Phylum: Chordata
- Class: Reptilia
- Order: Crocodylia
- Family: Alligatoridae
- Subfamily: Caimaninae
- Clade: Jacarea
- Genus: Caiman
- Species: †C. brevirostris

Binomial name
- †Caiman brevirostris Souza Filho, 1987

Extinct species of reptile

Caiman brevirostris is an extinct species of caiman that lived during the Late Miocene, around 11.6 million years ago, to the end of the Miocene 5.3 million years ago in Acre and Amazonas, Brazil as well as Urumaco, Venezuela. Several specimens have been referred to the species, but only 3 of them are confidently placed in the species. C. brevirostris was originally named in 1987 on the basis of a single, incomplete rostrum with an associated mandibular ramus that had been found in Acre, Brazil. C. brevirostris is very distinct among Caiman species and caimaninae overall in that it preserves a characteristically short and robust skull that bears blunt posterior teeth that were built to break down harder foods. This was an adaption for durophagy (the diet of hard-shelled organisms), likely to crush shells of mollusks and clams which were common in the wetlands that C. brevirostris resided in.

== Discovery and naming ==
Caiman brevirostris was described in 1987 by Brazilian paleontologist J. D. Souzha Filho on the basis of an incomplete rostrum and associated right mandibular ramus that were collected from the Miocene age strata of the Solimões Formation in the municipality of Sena Madureira in Acre, Brazil. The species name "brevirostris" comes from the Greek words brevis- meaning "short" and -rostrum meaning "snout", after the species' distinct short and robust snout. In the 2000s and 2010s, multiple specimens from the Urumaco Formation of Venezuela were incorrectly referred to C. brevirostris, instead actually belonging to other caimanines. In 2003 during a joint expedition between the Universidade Federal do Acre and the Universidade Federal de Rondônia, a skeleton including a complete skull and associated postcranial material of C. brevirostris was collected from the Talismã locality in Manuel Urban municipality in Amazonas, Brazil. The specimen was deposited in the collections of the Universidade Federal do Acre and described in 2014 in a study that found only the Talismã specimen and the holotype could be referred to the species. However, another specimen, an articulated skull and mandible from the Urumaco Formation, was also referred to C. brevirostris in 2016.

== Classification ==
Caiman brevirostris has been included in several phylogenetic analyses, but it most frequently comes up in polytomy with other fossil Caiman species. Below is the phylogenetic analysis conducted by Salas-Gismondi et al., 2015:

- Globidonta
  - Alligatorinae
  - - - †Albertochampsa
      - †Brachychampsa
      - †Stangerochampsa
    - Caimaninae (caimans)
      - †Gnatusuchus pebasensis
      - - †Globidentosuchus brachyrostris
        - - †Eocaiman cavernensis
          - - †Kuttanacaiman iquitosensis
            - - - †Purussaurus spp.
                - †Mourasuchus spp.
              - - - †Tsoabichi greenriverensis
                  - †Necrosuchus ionensis
                  - Paleosuchus spp.
                - Jacarea
                  - †Centenariosuchus gilmorei
                  - - - Caiman crocodilus
                      - Caiman yacare
                    - †Caiman brevirostris
                    - Caiman latirostris
                    - †Caiman wannlangstoni
                    - †La Venta caiman
                    - †Melanosuchus fisheri
                    - Melanosuchus niger

== Description and paleobiology ==
The most distinctive feature of Caiman brevirostris is its short and broad skull, the shortest skull known from a caimanine, that was built for crushing mollusks like its relative Globidentosuchus. This is also shown in the rostral anatomy, which has a short and wide splenial with few alveoli compared to other caimanines. The external nares are enlarged compared to other Caiman species, though this condition is similar to that of the "La Venta" Caiman from the Miocene of Colombia. The size of the orbits is also enlarged compared to other caimanines, but this characteristic is also present in Melanosuchus niger. One of the most unique traits of C. brevirostris is the blunt & low crowned posterior teeth that were adapted for eating harder prey than other caimanines. The premaxilla bears a long posterior process despite the short rostral bones. This process extends posteriorly past the 3rd maxillary alveolus, a trait of brevirostry. The prefrontals are separated by the frontal only and do not meet at the midline, in contrast to Venezuelan caimanines whose prefrontals contact at the midline. The frontal anteriorly projects beyond the prefrontal's anterior tip, which is likely again caused by the skull's shortening compared to other species.

Majority of the diagnostic traits of C. brevirostris lie in the mandible. C. brevirostris' mandible is short and wide, though the dentary symphysis is broken in all known specimens, leaving gaps in the knowledge of its anatomy. The splenial is completely different from those of other caimanines in that it is extremely robust and approaches the symphysis. The splenial contributes to half of the breadth of the mandibular ramus, forming a wide floor posteriorly, similar to that of Caiman latirostris, but is more pronounced and differs greatly from that of narrow-snouted caimanines. The wide posterior part of the splenial in C. brevirostris and the wide mandibles as a whole may be due to frequent usage of the posterior blunt and crushing teeth, as possibly being used for greater muscle attachment, but the muscles present in the area play only a minor role in jaw mechanics. The dentary has fewer alveoli compared to other Caiman species, again due to the shortening of the skull and mandible. The largest alveolus bears a blunt and low-crowned tooth, which may used for crushing feeding behavior, as in C. latirostris. Caiman brevirostris would therefore be an ecological analogue of the extant Caiman latirostris during the late Miocene in the Solimões Formation and Urumaco Formation.

== Paleoenvironment ==
As the Proto-Amazonian lake system and the Pebas system began to dissipate with the onset of the transcontinental Amazon Drainage, Caiman brevirostris inhabited the wetlands of the northern Urumaco Formation and the Solimões Formation in Acre State, Brazil, into the Late Miocene before eventually dying out during the Early Pliocene like much of the large crocodilian fauna of the Miocene wetlands. These wetlands provided favorable conditions to the native reptilian fauna, with several lineages of crocodilians reaching enormous sizes during the Mid to Late Miocene and also diversifying in ecology. Some of the enormous crocodilians that coexisted with C. brevirostris included the enormous caiman Purussaurus, the bizarre Mourasuchus and large-bodied gharials of the genus Gryposuchus, some species of which reaching lengths of over 10 meters. The largest turtle known, Stupendemys, with one specimen preserving a 2.86 meter long carapace, was also present in the region as an omnivore. Other durophagous caimanines inhabited the Urumaco and the Solimões, including the unusual Globidentosuchus in Urumaco and the "shovel faced" Gnatusuchus in the Solimões. Besides the aforementioned reptiles the waterways of Late Miocene South America were also inhabited by fish, including catfish such as Phractocephalus and Callichthyidae, characids such as Acregoliath rancii and the tambaqui (Colossoma macropomum), the South American lungfish (Lepidosiren paradoxa), trahiras (e.g. Paleohoplias assisbrasiliensis) and freshwater rays and sharks. Other turtles and tortoises found in the same deposits are Chelus columbiana (a fossil relative of the mata mata) and Chelonoidis. Further aquatic vertebrates included river dolphins and the large darter "Anhinga" fraileyi. At least within the Solimões Formation Stupendemys would have inhabited a floodplain or lacustrine environment with savannahs and gallery forests.
