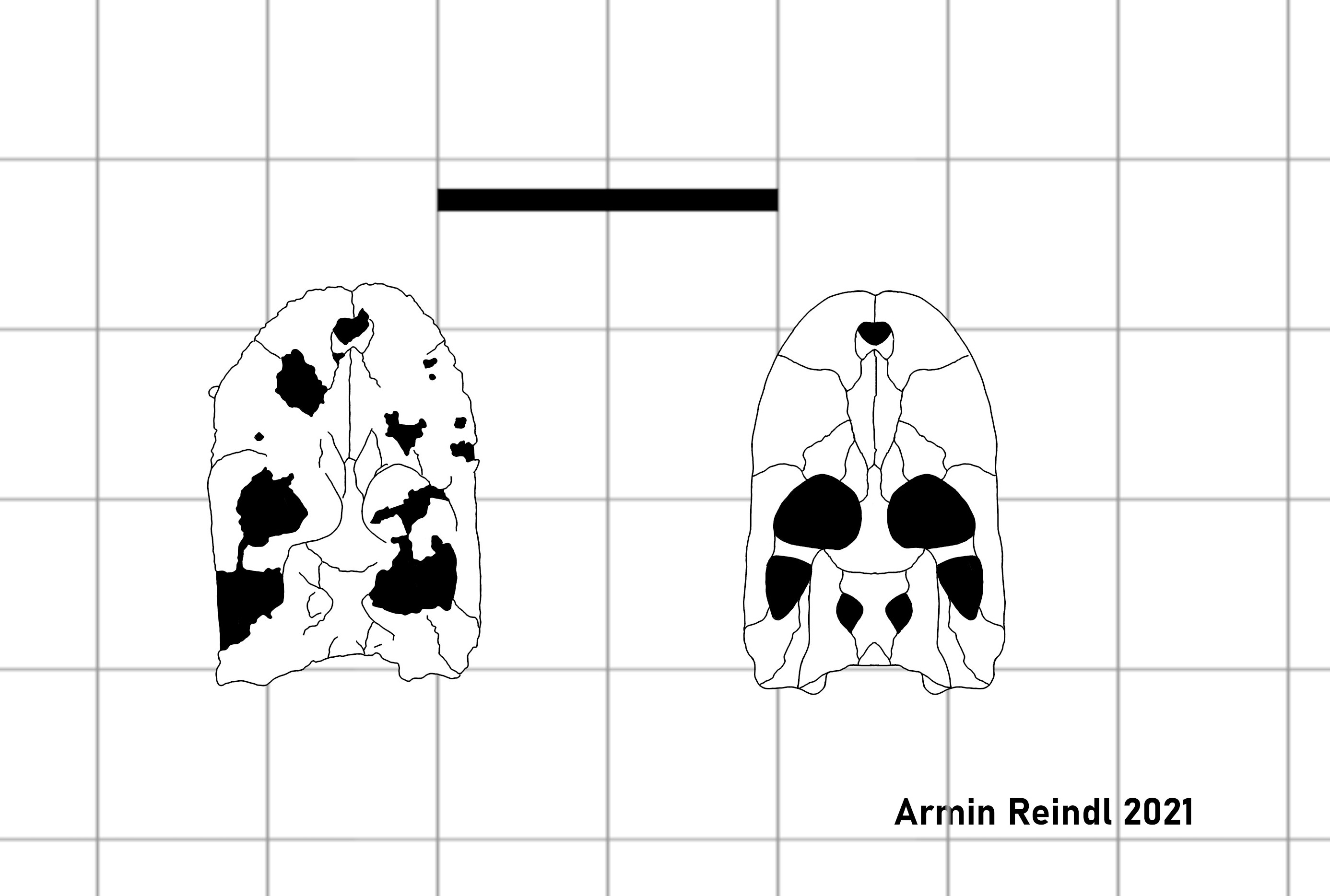

Scientific classification
- Kingdom: Animalia
- Phylum: Chordata
- Class: Reptilia
- Clade: Archosauria
- Order: Crocodilia
- Family: Alligatoridae
- Subfamily: Caimaninae
- Genus: †Gnatusuchus (Salas-Gismondi et al., 2015)

Type species
- †Gnatusuchus pebasensis Salas-Gismondi et al., 2015

= Gnatusuchus =

Gnatusuchus Temporal range: Mid Miocene (Laventan), 16–11.6 Ma

Extinct genus of reptiles

Gnatusuchus is an extinct genus of caiman represented by the type species Gnatusuchus pebasensis from the Middle Miocene Pebas Formation of Peru. Gnatusuchus lived about 13 million years ago (Ma) in a large wetland system called the Pebas mega-wetlands that covered over one million square kilometers of what is now the Amazon Basin (the modern basin had not yet developed at that time and instead of draining from west to east into the Atlantic Ocean, river systems drained northward through the wetlands and into the Caribbean Sea).

== Discovery and naming ==
Fish and molluscs have long been known from the Pebas Formation, however starting in 2002 systematic surveys of the Peruvian Iquitos area have led to the discovery of many vertebrate remains including further fish remains, mammals, turtles and an abundance of crocodilians, with two contemporaneous lignitic bonebeds preserving a minimum of 7 coexisting taxa. Among the fossils recovered from the Iquitos localities is the holotype of Gnatusuchus, MUSM 990, a nearly complete skull, as well as 3 referred specimens consisting of a right and two partial left mandibles.

The name Gnatusuchus is a combination of the Quechua word "Ñatu", meaning small nose, and the Greek "Souchos" for crocodile. The species name pebasensis is based on the Pebas Formation, which gets its name from an old Amazonian village.

== Description ==
Gnatusuchus has a exceptionally short and rounded snout with a length-breadth index of 1.55, which is only slightly higher than the length-breadth index of the bizarre Notosuchian Simosuchus from the Late Cretaceous of Madagascar. The short cranium leads to the almost-circular orbits being located at the approximate midpoint of the skull and the nares are apple-shaped. Much like the cranium, the mandible is short and wide and ends in a short but massive retroarticular process. The overall shape of the mandible is shovel-like, which may have been adaptations for feeding on bivalves.

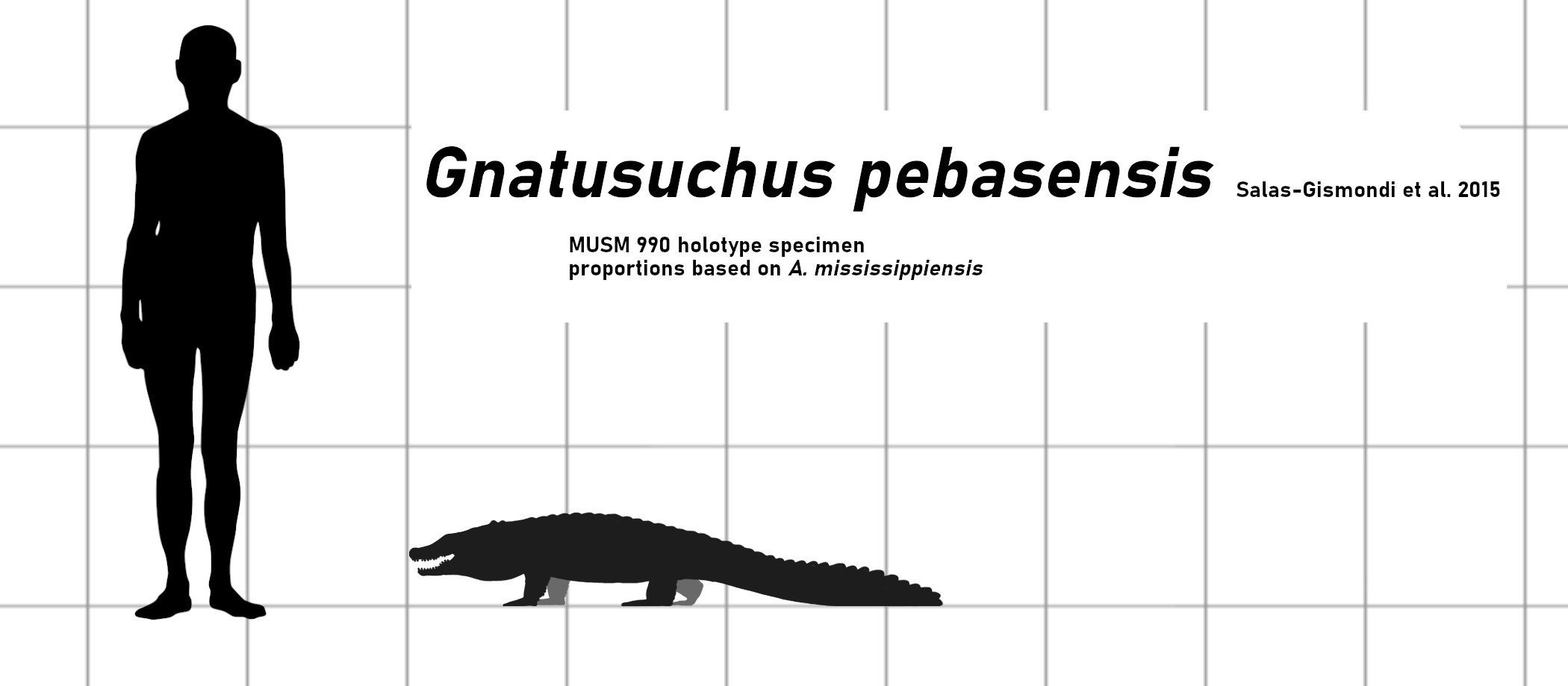
Upper estimate of Gnatusuchus

Gnatusuchus has highly reduced dentition compared to other blunt-snouted caimans, which typically possess 18 to 20 tooth alveoli, whereas Gnatusuchus has 14 teeth spread over the premaxilla and maxilla and 11 dentary teeth. The dentary teeth in particular can be separated into two groups with 7 anterior teeth and 4 "cheek teeth", the two groups separated by a diastema. Gnatusuchus exhibits a significant evolutionary loss of alveoli, with at least 3 alveoli being lost to create the diastema and further missing alveoli posterior to the 14th dentary tooth (while ancestral caimans would have possessed 4 to 6 more alveoli in that position). Besides the reduction of alveoli, Gnatusuchus also exhibits distinctly modified tooth morphology. The anterior most teeth are long and peg-like with blunt crowns. They are procumbent and shown apical wear. The posterior teeth meanwhile are globular shaped with a distinct neck.

Based on the size of the skull material Salas-Gismondi et al. estimate a total body length of 148.9 to 167.7 centimetres (4.89 to 5.50 ft) depending on the proportions used for the calculation. The upper estimates are based on the American Alligator, while a smaller body length was recovered using the proportions of Morelet's Crocodile.

== Taxonomy ==
A phylogenetic analysis published alongside its initial description placed Gnatusuchus as the most basal member of the clade Caimaninae. Two other caimanines with crushing dentitions, Kuttanacaiman and Globidentosuchus, were also found to be basal caimanines, suggesting that a specialized crushing dentition was ancestral to the group. Later caimanines, including most modern species, have more generalized dentitions, although a few derived species such as C. wannlangstoni seem to have reacquired crushing teeth. Below is a cladogram from that analysis with crushing-type species in bold:

- Globidonta
  - Alligatorinae
  - - - †Albertochampsa
      - †Brachychampsa
      - †Stangerochampsa
    - Caimaninae (caimans)
      - †**Gnatusuchus pebasensis**
      - - †**Globidentosuchus brachyrostris**
        - - †Eocaiman cavernensis
          - - †**Kuttanacaiman iquitosensis**
            - - - †Purussaurus spp.
                - †Mourasuchus spp.
              - - - †Tsoabichi greenriverensis
                  - †Necrosuchus ionensis
                  - Paleosuchus spp.
                - Jacarea
                  - †Centenariosuchus gilmorei
                  - - - Caiman crocodilus
                      - Caiman yacare
                    - †Caiman brevirostris
                    - Caiman latirostris
                    - †**Caiman wannlangstoni**
                    - †La Venta caiman
                    - †Melanosuchus fisheri
                    - Melanosuchus niger

== Paleobiology ==
The Pebas Mega-Wetland System was created by the rise of the Andes during the beginning of the Neogene, eventually reaching an enormous size around of 1 million km2 during the middle Miocene. The wetlands consisted of a wide array of lakes, embayments, swamps and rivers that all drained into the Caribbean. The dysoxic marshes and swamps of the Pebas Formation were home to a great diversity of freshwater invertebrates (ostracods and molluscs) with a total of 85 co-occurring endemic species, most abundant of which being corbulid pachydontine bivalves. These bivalves possessed thick shells, profuse ornamentation and a series of other adaptations against predation. However, both successful and unsuccessful scaring caused by crushing predation can be found commonly in these bivalve fossils. This, alongside the specialised dentition and other adaptations of Gnatusuchus point to a durophagous diet in these caimans. Furthermore, the particular shape of Gnatusuchus may also point to its specific feeding strategy. Salas-Gismondi et al. hypothesize that Gnatusuchus used its jaw and procumbent teeth to "shovel" while crushing shells with the tightly packed posterior teeth.

Gnatusuchus shared its environment with 2 other taxa of durophagous caimans, the basal Kuttanacaiman and Caiman wannlangstoni, a more derived caiman that independently developed crushing dentition. Besides these taxa with similar diets, the Pebas Mega-Wetlands were also shared by an unnamed species of Dwarf Caimain, the piscivorous, longirostrine gryposuchine Gryposuchus pachakamue, the gulp-feeding Mourasuchus atopus and the massive Purussaurus neivensis.

== Extinction ==
Strata directly overlying the ones Gnatusuchus was found in document the first decline in native mollusc diversity, caused by a marine incursion. Around 12 million years ago began the demise of the dysoxic lacustrine Pebas ecosystem following the continued uplift of the Andes splitting Proto-Amazonia into the modern river basins and the initiation of the transcontinental Amazon River drainage. The youngest records of Gnatusuchus were found in the Nueva Unión area south of Iquitos, however none of the other durophagous caimans of the Pebas Formation have been found there. Following the demise of the Pebas Mega-Wetlands, crushing caimans managed to persist into the Late Miocene in the Urumaco Formation while decreasing in diversity in the Solimões Formation of Acre. However Gnatusuchus itself has not been found in either formation.
