= Globidentosuchus =

Globidentosuchus Temporal range: Mid-Late Miocene (Mayoan-Montehermosan), 11.6–5.3 Ma

Scientific classification
- Kingdom: Animalia
- Phylum: Chordata
- Class: Reptilia
- Order: Crocodylia
- Family: Alligatoridae
- Subfamily: Caimaninae
- Genus: †Globidentosuchus; Scheyer et al., 2013

Type species
- †Globidentosuchus brachyrostris Scheyer et al., 2013

Extinct genus of reptiles

Globidentosuchus is an extinct genus of basal caimanine crocodylian known from the late Middle to Late Miocene of the Middle and the Upper Members of the Urumaco Formation at Urumaco, Venezuela. Its skull was very short and robust, with large units of spherical teeth used to break the shells of molluscs as part of its durophagus diet. It is thought to be one of the most basal Caimanines, even sharing some traits with alligatorids.

== Etymology ==
The generic name Globidentosuchus is derived from the Latin roots globus meaning "sphere" and dens meaning "tooth", referring to the spherical teeth in the posterior skull, and Greek souchos meaning "crocodile" after its classification. The species name brachyrostris is derived from the Greek brachys meaning "short" and Latin rostrum meaning "snout" after the truncated and robust rostrum of the species.

== History and taxonomy ==
Globidentosuchus was described in 2013 by T. M. Scheyer and colleagues, the type and only species being G. brachyrostris, on the basis of cranial and mandibular remains that had been collected from the El Picache and Domo de Agua Blanca localities in Urumaco, Venezuela, the fossils coming from the Upper Miocene aged strata of the Upper and Middle Members of the Urumaco Formation. The chosen holotype (AMU-CURS-222) consists of a nearly skull with associated mandibles, including several of the spherical crushing teeth, and the paratype (AMU-CURS-224) was more fragmentary, consisting of only an incomplete skull associated with mandibles. Some other fragmentary specimens were referred in 2013 and 2016, but all were either fossils of the skull or mandible. In 2017, a partial skull that was first described as a skull of Melanosuchus fisheri from the Urumaco Formation of Falcón, Venezuela was reassigned to Globidentosuchus, making it the first known Globidentosuchus specimen.

== Description and paleobiology ==
Globidentosuchus was a small caimanine species at only 1.72 metres (5.6 ft) meters in length and 16.7 kilograms (37 lb) in weight, around the same size as the average adult male Caiman crocodilus. The most notable feature of Globidentosuchus is its U-shaped, wide, and short skull and robust, deep mandibles that were built for crushing hard prey like molluscs. Globidentosuchus differentiates from other caimanines in several areas, such as; a fused external naris that was not bisected by the nasals, the smooth skull with weak preorbital ridges and no rostral or interorbital ridges, in strong contrast to the strong ridges in gavialoids and some caimans. Each mandible preserves 18 teeth, 10 conical teeth in the anterior portion and 8 spherical, robust teeth in the posterior portion. These spherical teeth were tightly packed, making a crushing unit that was built to crush molluscs. This morphology is also observed in several other caimanines, like Caiman brevirostris, C. latirostris, and Allognathosuchus, though none of these taxa have crushing units like in Globidentosuchus. The mandible has 13 alvelovi, the largest being in the back of the mandible but they get much smaller after the 4th alvelovi, a trait missing in other caimanines but was likely convergently evolved as some early alligatoroids bare this.

== Classification ==
Globidentosuchus is often recovered as one of or the most basal caimanines, with the original phylogenetic analysis in 2013 finding it to be a stem caimanine and the sister taxon to all other caimanines, even more basal than Paleogene caimanines like Necrosuchus and Eocaiman. Hastings et al. (2013) proposed that this phylogenetic position is because of a potential relict population of basal caimanines that persisted in Central America and/or northern South America into the Late Miocene, as shown by Globidentosuchus and its basal relatives Gnatusuchus and Culebrasuchus, though more fossils are needed to confirm this.

The following tree is based on the results recovered by Cidade et al. (2017), excluding the North American Orthogenysuchus and including the then newly named Mourasuchus pattersoni while also following the synonymy of M. nativus with M. arendsi. This analysis also recovers Globidentosuchus as one of the most basal caimanines at a similar level to Culebrasuchus and Gnatusuchus.

- Alligatoridae
  - Alligatorinae
  - Caimaninae
    - Culebrasuchus mesoamericanus
    - - Gnatusuchus pebasensis
      - - Globidentosuchus brachyrostris
        - - - Eocaiman palaeocenicus
            - - Eocaiman cavernensis
              - Eocaiman itaboraiensis
          - - - Kuttanacaiman iquitosensis
              - - Tsoabichi greenriverensis
                - - Paleosuchus palpebrosus
                  - Paleosuchus trigonatus
            - - Caiman wannlangstoni
              - - Jacarea
                  - - Caiman yacare
                    - Caiman crocodilus
                  - - Caiman brevirostris
                    - - Caiman latirostris
                      - Melanosuchus niger
                - - Centenariosuchus gilmorei
                  - - - Purussaurus neivensis
                      - Purussaurus mirandai
                    - - - Mourasuchus arendsi
                        - Mourasuchus atopus
                      - - Mourasuchus amazonensi
                        - Mourasuchus pattersoni
                        - UFAC-1424

== Paleoenvironment ==
As the Proto-Amazonian lake system and the Pebas system began to dissipate with the onset of the transcontinental Amazon Drainage, Globidentosuchus inhabited the wetlands of the northern Urumaco Formation in Venezuela into the Late Miocene before eventually dying out by the Early Pliocene like much of the large crocodilian fauna of the Miocene wetlands. These wetlands provided favorable conditions to the native reptilian fauna, with several lineages of crocodilians reaching enormous sizes during the Mid to Late Miocene and also diversifying in ecology. Some of the enormous crocodilians that coexisted with Globidentosuchus included the enormous caimain Purussaurus, the bizarre Mourasuchus and large-bodied gharials of the genus Gryposuchus, some species of which reaching lengths of over 10 meters. The largest turtle known, Stupendemys, with one specimen preserving a 2.86 meter long carapace, was also present in the region as an omnivore. Other durophagus caimanines inhabited the Urumaco, including the unusual Caiman brevirostris and extant C. latirostris. Besides the aforementioned reptiles, the waterways of Late Miocene South America were also inhabited by fish, including catfish such as Phractocephalus and Callichthyidae, characids such as Acregoliath rancii and the tambaqui (Colossoma macropomum), the South American lungfish (Lepidosiren paradoxa), trahiras (e.g. Paleohoplias assisbrasiliensis) and freshwater rays and sharks. Other turtles and tortoises found in the same deposits are Chelus columbiana (a fossil relative of the mata mata) and Chelonoidis. Further aquatic vertebrates included river dolphins and the large darter "Anhinga" fraileyi. Palynofloras found in the Urumaco Formation suggest a continuation of the Amazonian forest into northwestern Venezuela during the Miocene, while the Early Pliocene replaced these forests with xerophyte-dominated habitats after the collapse of the Urumaco delta and its environment, which ended the great crocodilian diversity that was present in Venezuela.
