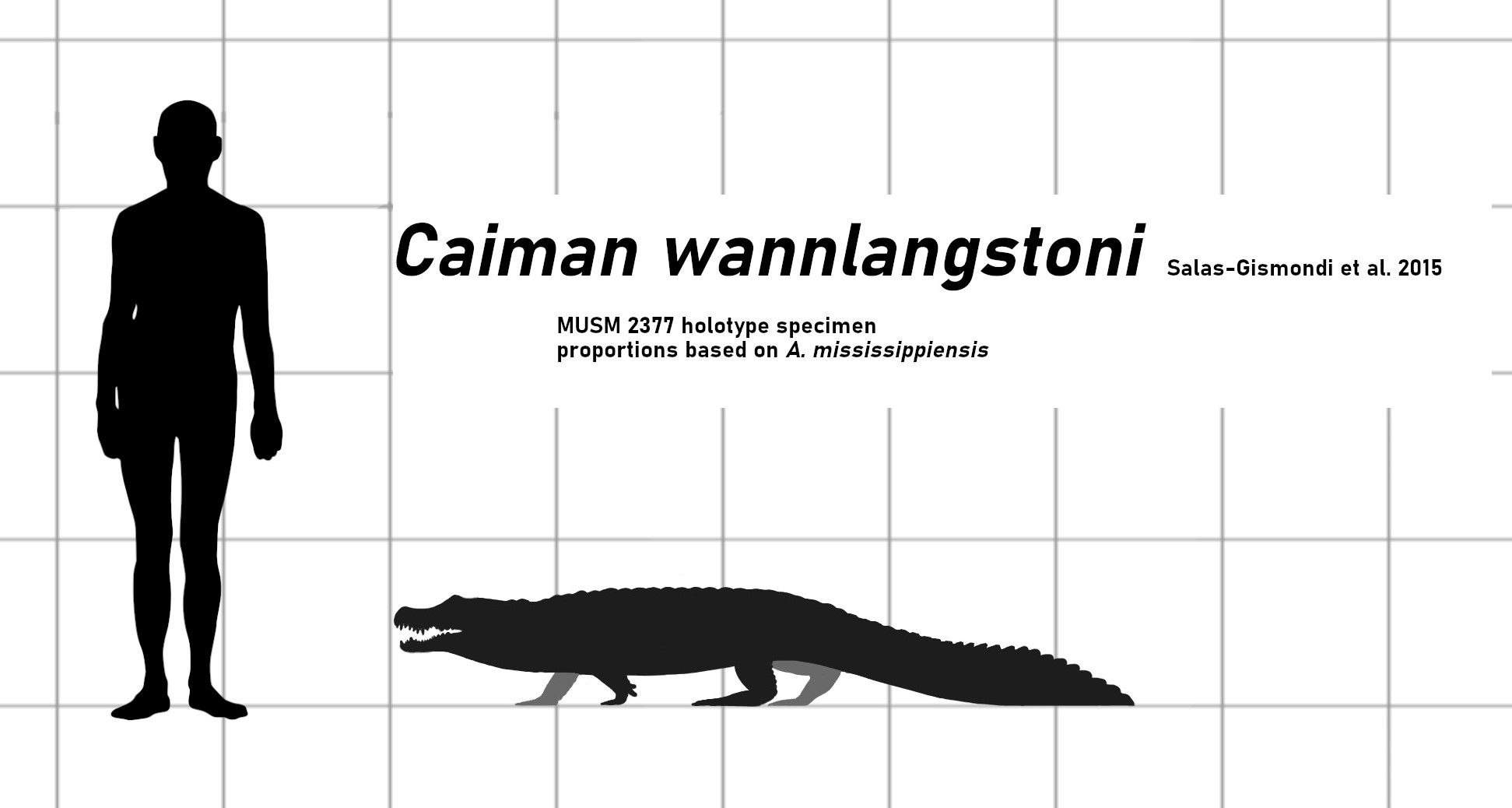
- Size compared to a human.

Scientific classification
- Kingdom: Animalia
- Phylum: Chordata
- Class: Reptilia
- Clade: Archosauria
- Order: Crocodilia
- Superfamily: Alligatoroidea
- Family: Alligatoridae
- Subfamily: Caimaninae
- Clade: Jacarea
- Genus: Caiman
- Species: †C. wannlangstoni

Binomial name
- †Caiman wannlangstoni Salas-Gismondi et al., 2015

= Caiman wannlangstoni =

Caiman wannlangstoni Temporal range: Mid-Late Miocene, 16–5.3 Ma

Extinct species of reptile

Caiman wannlangstoni is an extinct species of caiman that lived in what is now the Amazon Basin and surrounding areas during the Middle and Late Miocene. Fossils of C. wannlangstoni have been found in the Pebas Formation near Iquitos in Peru and include partial skulls and isolated skull bones. Other fossils were uncovered from the Urumaco Formation in Venezuela and the Laventan Honda Group of Colombia. The species was first described in 2015. Features that in combination distinguish C. wannlangstoni from other caimans include a deep snout, a wavy upper jaw margin, a large and upward-directed narial opening (hole for the nostrils), and blunt teeth at the back of the jaws. Based on the sizes of the skulls, its estimated body length is about 211 to 227 centimetres (6.92 to 7.45 ft).

== Etymology ==
The species name wannlangstoni is named in honor of American paleontologist Wann Langston Jr. for his contributions to the study of South American fossil crocodilians.

== Discovery and taxonomy ==
Caiman wannlangstoni was described in 2015 by Rodolfo Salas-Gismondi et al on the basis a well preserved partial skull (MUSM 2377) that had been collected from the late Middle Miocene strata of the Pebas Formation in "Locality IQ26" in Iquitos, Peru. A second specimen was referred to the species from Iquitos, though it only included several associated skull and mandible elements. A specimen consisting of a right premaxilla and maxilla that was previously referred to Caiman lutescens from the Late Miocene Urumaco Formation in Venezuela was also referred to the species by Salas-Gismondi et al., extending the species' range into more of Proto-Amazonia. A partial skull from the La Venta Formation of Colombia may be from C. lanngstoni, but it lacks some diagnostic features of the species.

== Classification ==
The phylogenetic position of C. wannlangstoni with respect to other caimans is interesting in that it is more derived than other crushing-dentition caimans like Gnatusuchus, Globidentosuchus, and Kuttanacaiman, which seem to be the most basal members of the group. Therefore, a crushing dentition was likely present in the ancestors of caimans but later lost, and then was reacquired C. wannlangstoni. Below is a cladogram showing this pattern, with crushing-dentition caimans in bold:

- Globidonta
  - Alligatorinae
  - - - †Albertochampsa
      - †Brachychampsa
      - †Stangerochampsa
    - Caimaninae (caimans)
      - †Gnatusuchus pebasensis
      - - †Globidentosuchus brachyrostris
        - - †Eocaiman cavernensis
          - - †Kuttanacaiman iquitosensis
            - - - †Purussaurus spp.
                - †Mourasuchus spp.
              - - - †Tsoabichi greenriverensis
                  - †Necrosuchus ionensis
                  - Paleosuchus spp.
                - Jacarea
                  - †Centenariosuchus gilmorei
                  - - - Caiman crocodilus
                      - Caiman yacare
                    - †Caiman brevirostris
                    - Caiman latirostris
                    - †**Caiman wannlangstoni**
                    - †La Venta caiman
                    - †Melanosuchus fisheri
                    - Melanosuchus niger

== Description ==
Caiman wannlangstoni was a small-medium-sized Caiman species, with estimates placing it from 210.5 – 226.7 cm long. The most distinctive feature of C. wannlangstoni is its high and robust rostrum, which has very large nasal openings and strong sinuous rostral margins. The species also has robust, large, and globular posterior teeth, built for "crushing" mollusks and hard shelled prey. The skull is roughly triangular in dorsal view with large, oval orbits. The posterior margin of skull table is semicircular and overhangs the occipital plate, resembling the skull tables in C. latirostris and Melanosuchus niger. Kuttanacaiman iquitosensis has a very similar skull anatomy to C. wannlangstoni, but C. wannlangstoni differs in the anatomy of its orbitals and mandibles. The overall skull anatomy of C. wannlangstoni is very similar to that of C. brevirostris from Brazil, but the latter has a shorter and parallel-sided rostrum than C. wannlangstoni, among other distinguishing traits.

== Paleoenvironment ==
C. wannlangstoni lived through a major climatic and ecological shift in South America during the Middle to Late Miocene. The oldest fossils of the species come from the Pebas Formation, which was deposited during the Middle Miocene about 13 million years ago (Ma) over a vast area of Amazonia called the Pebas mega-wetland. The Pebas mega-wetland developed at the start of the Neogene, coincident with the main phase of uplift of the Andes Mountains and the formation of a massive (>1 million square kilometers) drainage basin that extended from the Andes to the Caribbean Sea. During this time C. wannlangstoni would have inhabited oxygen-poor marshes and swamps, feeding on thick-shelled molluscs alongside other caiman species with crushing dentitions like Gnatusuchus pebasensis and Kuttanacaiman iquitosensis. Beginning around 10.5 Ma, continued uplift of the Andes separated the Pebas region into three smaller basins: the Magdalena, Orinoco and Amazon basins. The youngest remains of C. wannlangstoni come from the Urumaco Formation, which was deposited during the Late Miocene around 6 to 9 Ma in the early Orinoco basin. At this time C. wannlangstoni would have lived in more energetic and oxygen-rich river environments. It occurs alongside several other caiman species, including Caiman brevirostris and Globidentosuchus brachyrostris, that also had crushing dentition. This assemblage of crushing-dentition caimans is similar to the earlier caiman assemblage from the Pebas Formation, but is not found in either the Magdalena or Amazon basins during the Late Miocene, suggesting that the Orinoco basin could have been the last refuge for these types of caimans before they became extinct. The crusher caimans went extinct due to their extreme specializations and were replaced by generalist caimanine species, many of which exist today.
