= Caiman venezuelensis =

Caiman venezuelensis Temporal range: Pleistocene (Uquian-Lujanian) ~2.588–0.012 Ma

Scientific classification
- Domain: Eukaryota
- Kingdom: Animalia
- Phylum: Chordata
- Class: Reptilia
- Clade: Archosauromorpha
- Clade: Archosauriformes
- Order: Crocodilia
- Family: Alligatoridae
- Genus: Caiman
- Species: †C. venezuelensis

Binomial name
- †Caiman venezuelensis Fortier & Rincón, 2012

Extinct species of reptile

Caiman venezuelensis is an extinct species of caiman that lived in South America during the Pleistocene. The holotype of C. venezuelensis — OR-1677, a partial left premaxilla bone — was discovered in the locality of El Breal of Orocual, in the Mesa Formation, in the state of Monagas, Venezuela, the country of which derives their species name.

Cidade et al. (2019) rejected the classification of C. venezuelensis as a distinct species, and considered it to be a junior synonym of the extant spectacled caiman (Caiman crocodilus).

== Description ==
The premaxilla preserved measures 24.6 millimetres (0.97 in) long, with an estimated total length of 28 to 30 millimetres (1.1 to 1.2 in). It has a strong premaxillary sutural surface, a hole developed in the fourth tooth of the jaw bone, and short spaces between the alveoli, indicating that despite its size, their characteristics were different from the current young alligatorids and thus corresponds to subadult or adult individual. Then C. venezuelensis could one of the smallest known species of alligatorids, even smaller than the dwarf caimans of the genus Paleosuchus. It is also distinguished from other alligatorids have long narrow premaxilla, about twice as long as wide.

== Distribution ==
Despite the abundance of fossil sites of the Pliocene and Pleistocene in South America, the remains of crocodilians of these periods are scarce and fragmentary and generally little studied. C. venezuelensis is one of the few findings confirmed of a distinct species of this period and may help clarify the history of this group after the Miocene.
