= Kuttanacaiman =

Kuttanacaiman Temporal range: Middle Miocene (Friasian-Mayoan) ~15.97–11.608 Ma

Scientific classification
- Kingdom: Animalia
- Phylum: Chordata
- Class: Reptilia
- Clade: Archosauria
- Order: Crocodilia
- Family: Alligatoridae
- Subfamily: Caimaninae
- Genus: †Kuttanacaiman; Salas-Gismondi et al., 2015

Type species
- †Kuttanacaiman iquitosensis Salas-Gismondi et al., 2015

Extinct genus of reptiles

Kuttanacaiman is a monotypic genus of extinct caiman represented by the type species Kuttanacaiman iquitosensis. Kuttanacaiman lived in what is now the Amazon basin during the Middle Miocene, approximately 13 million years ago (Ma). The species was named in 2015 on the basis of one nearly complete skull and a second partial skull from the Pebas Formation near Iquitos, Peru. K. iquitosensis is characterized by a short, rounded snout and blunt teeth at the back of its jaws that were likely adapted to crushing freshwater bivalves. Its estimated total body length is 171.2 to 189.1 centimetres (5.62 to 6.20 ft).

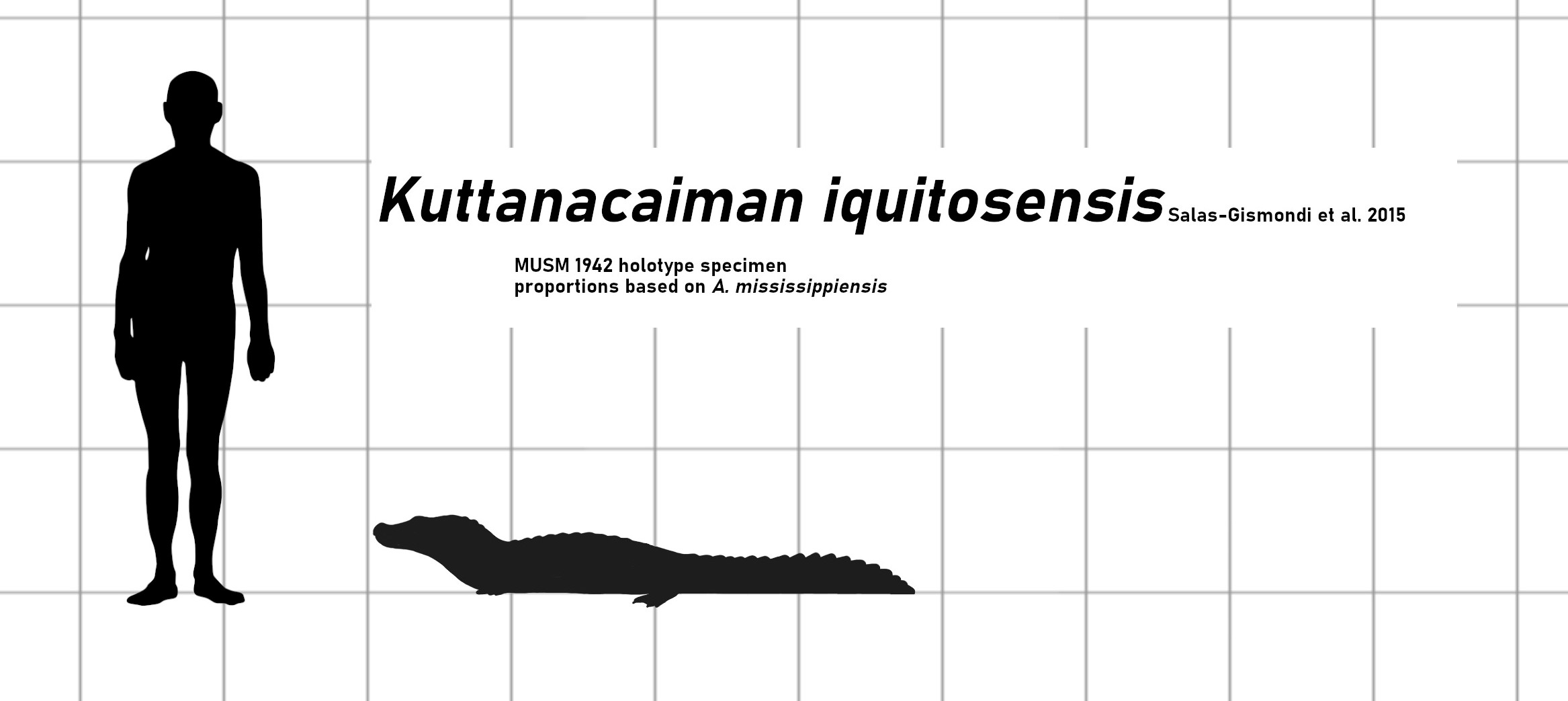
Kuttanacaiman size comparison

== Etymology ==
The genus name comes from the Quechua word kuttana, meaning "grinding or crushing machine", and its species name honors the Iquitos native peoples.

== Habitat ==
Kuttanacaiman lived in Amazonia at a time before the Amazon River Basin was established; in its place was a massive wetland, called the Pebas Mega-Wetland System, that covered an approximate area of over 1,000,000 square kilometres (390,000 sq mi) in a drainage basin east of the still forming Andes, which at the time were experiencing rapid uplift in certain parts. Kuttanacaiman coexisted with six other crocodylian species, including two other caiman species with crushing dentitions: Gnatusuchus pebasensis and Caiman wannlangstoni. Shells belonging to the bivalve genus Pachydon form thick fossil beds in the Pebas Formation and may have been a food source for Kuttanacaiman and these other caimans in swamps and marshes.

== Taxonomy ==
A phylogenetic analysis published in 2015 indicates that Kuttanacaiman is one of the most basal members of the clade Caimaninae. Other basal caimanines such as Gnatusuchus and Globidentosuchus also possess crushing teeth, suggesting that this type of dentition was ancestral for the clade. Later caimanines, including most living species in the genus Caiman, have more generalized dentitions, but some species such as C. wannlangstoni and C. latirostris seem to have re-evolved crushing dentitions. Below is a cladogram showing this evolutionary pattern, with crushing-dentition caimanine species in bold:

- Globidonta
  - Alligatorinae
  - - - †Albertochampsa
      - †Brachychampsa
      - †Stangerochampsa
    - Caimaninae (caimans)
      - †**Gnatusuchus pebasensis**
      - - †**Globidentosuchus brachyrostris**
        - - †Eocaiman cavernensis
          - - †**Kuttanacaiman iquitosensis**
            - - - †Purussaurus spp.
                - †Mourasuchus spp.
              - - - †Tsoabichi greenriverensis
                  - †Necrosuchus ionensis
                  - Paleosuchus spp.
                - Jacarea
                  - †Centenariosuchus gilmorei
                  - - - Caiman crocodilus
                      - Caiman yacare
                    - †Caiman brevirostris
                    - **Caiman latirostris**
                    - †**Caiman wannlangstoni**
                    - †La Venta caiman
                    - †Melanosuchus fisheri
                    - Melanosuchus niger
