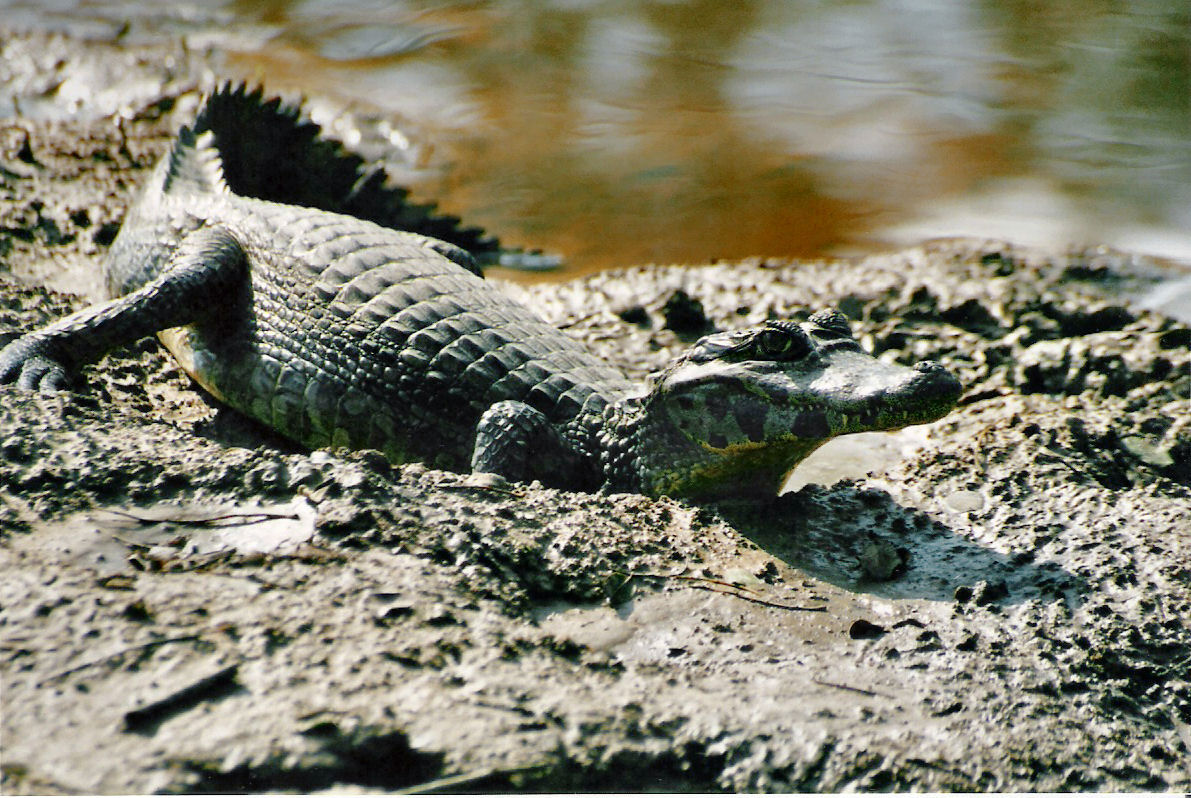
- Yacare caiman, Caiman yacare

Scientific classification
- Kingdom: Animalia
- Phylum: Chordata
- Class: Reptilia
- Clade: Archosauria
- Order: Crocodilia
- Family: Alligatoridae
- Subfamily: Caimaninae
- Clade: Jacarea; Norell, 1988

Genera
- Caiman; Melanosuchus; †Acresuchus; †Centenariosuchus; †Necrosuchus; †Purussaurus

= Jacarea =

Jacarea Temporal range: Paleocene–Present, 66–0 Ma

Clade of reptiles

Jacarea is a clade of caimans within the subfamily Caimaninae. Jacarea was first named by Norell in 1988 to include the extant species within the genera Caiman and Melanosuchus, while excluding the dwarf caiman genus Paleosuchus. In 1999, Brochu formally cladistically defined Jacarea as the last common ancestor of Caiman latirosris (Broad-snouted caiman), Caiman crocodilus (Spectacled caiman), Caiman yacare (Yacare caiman), Melanosuchus niger (Black caiman), and all its descendants. Molecular DNA phylogenetic studies recover Paleosuchus as outside of Jacarea, although morphological studies are inconsistent.

The cladogram below shows the results of the strict consensus phylogenetic analysis of the 2020 Cicade et al. study:

- Caimaninae
  - †Culebrasuchus mesoamericanus
  - - †Gnatusuchus pebasensis
    - - †Globidentosuchus brachyrostris
      - - - †Eocaiman palaeocenicus
          - - †Eocaiman itaboraiensis
            - †Eocaiman cavernensis
        - - †Kuttanacaiman iquitosensis
          - - - - †Bottosaurus harlani
                - †Tsoabichi greenriverensis
              - - Paleosuchus trigonatus Smooth-fronted caiman
                - Paleosuchus palpebrosus Cuvier's dwarf caiman
            - - - †Caiman gasparinae
                - - - †Mourasuchus amazonensis
                    - †Mourasuchus pattersoni
                  - - †Mourasuchus atopus
                    - †Mourasuchus arendsi
              - Jacarea
                - †Necrosuchus ionensis
                - †UCMP 39978
                - †Caiman wannlangstoni
                - †Centenariosuchus gilmorei
                - †Caiman brevirostris
                - Melanosuchus niger Black caiman
                - Caiman latirostris Broad-snouted caiman
                - Caiman yacare Yacare caiman
                - Caiman crocodilus Spectacled caiman
                - - †Acresuchus pachytemporalis
                  - - †Purussaurus neivensis
                    - †Purussaurus mirandai
                    - †Purussaurus brasiliensis
