= Caiman australis =

Caiman australis Temporal range: Late Miocene, 9.0–7.3 Ma

Scientific classification
- Domain: Eukaryota
- Kingdom: Animalia
- Phylum: Chordata
- Class: Reptilia
- Clade: Archosauromorpha
- Clade: Archosauriformes
- Order: Crocodilia
- Family: Alligatoridae
- Subfamily: Caimaninae
- Clade: Jacarea
- Genus: Caiman
- Species: †C. australis

Binomial name
- †Caiman australis (Bravard, 1858)

Synonyms
- Crocodilus australis Bravard, 1858; Alligator australis (Bravard, 1858); Proalligator australis (Bravard, 1858)

Extinct species of reptile

Caiman australis is an extinct species of caiman described in 1858 on the basis of a left maxilla that was collected from the Upper Miocene age Ituzaingó Formation of Entre Rios, Argentina.

== Etymology ==
The species name “australis” comes from the Greek root austral, which means “southern” after its discovery in South America.

== Discovery and taxonomy ==
Caiman australis was first described by French engineer Auguste Bravard, who had been hired by the Museo de la Confederación, on the basis of a complete left maxilla that had been collected from Upper Miocene strata belonging to the Ituzaingó Formation along the banks of the Parana River in Entre Ríos Province, Argentina.

Bravard named it Crocodilus australis in 1858, believing that it was a species of crocodile due to its elongated maxilla. It was the first named “Mesopotamian” species and the only one known for 2 decades. Bravard gave it a very brief description, but Hermann Burmeister and Cayetano Rovereto gave more detailed descriptions in 1883 and 1912 respectively.

The species was placed in several genera by different authors, with Juan B. Ambrosetti placing it in Proalligator in 1887, Florentino Ameghino placed it in Alligator in 1898, until it was finally placed in Caiman in 2012. Some additional fossils have been suggested to be from the species, but a lack of overlap prevents definitive assignment.

== Description ==
Due to the fragmentary nature of the holotype, few diagnostic traits are known for Caiman australis. C. australis had a narrow snout, with a narrower and longer maxilla than living Caiman species. The 3rd and 4th alveoli are the largest alveoli and are similarly sized, with smaller interalvelovar spaces on the maxilla. The first, second and fifth to ninth alveoli are similar in size, and the third and fourth alveoli are the largest of the maxillary tooth row, a characteristic present in some other Caiman species. The lateral margin of maxilla is also less festooned than in other Caiman species, in dorsal and lateral view. The maxilla is also adorned with an unusual predominance of prominent and elongated grooves and bumps.

== Paleoenvironment ==
Fossils of Caiman australis have been recovered from the Ituzaingó Formation of Entre Rios, Argentina, which preserves vast tidal flats similar to those in the modern day Amazon and a warm climate. Large, herbivorous notoungulate mammals in the Ituzaingó Formation were widespread, including the toxodontids Xotodon and Adinotherium, and litopterns such as Brachytherium, Cullinia, Diadiaphorus, Neobrachytherium, Oxyodontherium, Paranauchenia, Promacrauchenia, Proterotherium and Scalabrinitherium. Large, armored glyptodonts like Palaehoplophorus, Eleutherocercus, and Plohophorus lived in the area as well as other cingulates like the pampatheres Kraglievichia and Scirrotherium. Carnivores included the phorusrhacids Devincenzia and Andalgalornis and sparassodonts, with giant crocodilians like Gryposuchus and Mourasuchus in the freshwater. Bamboos, coconut palms, and other palms were prevalent.
