= Acregoliath =

Acregoliath Temporal range: Miocene, 13.76–13.34 Ma

Scientific classification
- Kingdom: Animalia
- Phylum: Chordata
- Class: Actinopterygii
- Division: Teleostei
- Genus: †Acregoliath; Richter, 1989
- Species: †A. rancii

Binomial name
- †Acregoliath rancii Richter, 1989

Extinct genus of fishes

Acregoliath is an extinct genus of ray-finned fish that existed during the middle of Miocene epoch, about 13.76 to 13.34 million years ago. It is known from very fragmentary remains which consist of several scales that were found in Brazil. Judging from the size of the scales (dorsoventral height up to 8 cm (3.1 in), thickness up to 1.3 cm (0.5 in)), Acregoliath is believed to be a very large freshwater fish. But due to the fragmentary nature of the fossils, its exact size and appearance are difficult to reconstruct. Its scale morphology has been compared with extant osteoglossiform, dipnoan, or siluriform fish especially the loricarioid.
