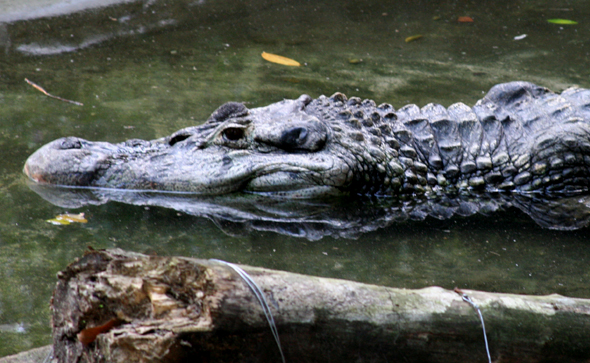

Scientific classification
- Kingdom: Animalia
- Phylum: Chordata
- Class: Reptilia
- Order: Crocodylia
- Family: Alligatoridae
- Subfamily: Caimaninae
- Clade: Jacarea
- Genus: Melanosuchus; Gray, 1862

Species
- Melanosuchus niger; †Melanosuchus latrubessei

= Melanosuchus =

Melanosuchus Temporal range: Late Miocene-Present, 11.6–0 Ma

Genus of caiman

Melanosuchus, from Ancient Greek μέλας (mélas), meaning "black", and σούχος (soúkhos), meaning "crocodile", is a genus of caiman. The genus is most commonly referred to as the "Black Caimans". The black caiman of South America is the sole extant (living) species, and is the largest living member of the subfamily Caimaninae, as well as the entire alligator family Alligatoridae.

== Taxonomy ==
There are two known valid species of Melanosuchus, one extant and one extinct:

- Melanosuchus niger (Spix, 1825) – known as the Black caiman, native to the Amazon basin of South America
- †Melanosuchus latrubessei Souza-Filho et al., 2020 – discovered in the Solimões Formation of Brazil, dating from the Upper Miocene

Melanosuchus fisheri, named by Medina in 1976, from the Late Miocene Urumaco Formation of Venezuela is sometimes considered as a nomen dubium, and possibly synonymous with Melanosuchus niger.

=== Phylogeny ===
Melanosuchus is a member of the subfamily Caimaninae, which contains the two other extant genera Caiman and Paleosuchus, all of which are native to South and Central America. The below cladogram shows the relationships of all extant genera within Crocodilia (excluding separate extinct taxa), based on molecular phylogenetic studies.

- Crocodilia
  - Alligatoridae
    - Caimaninae
      - - Caiman
        - Melanosuchus
      - Paleosuchus
    - Alligatorinae
      Alligator
  - Longirostres
    - Crocodylidae
      - Crocodylus
      - - Mecistops
        - Osteolaemus
    - Gavialidae
      - Gavialis
      - Tomistoma
