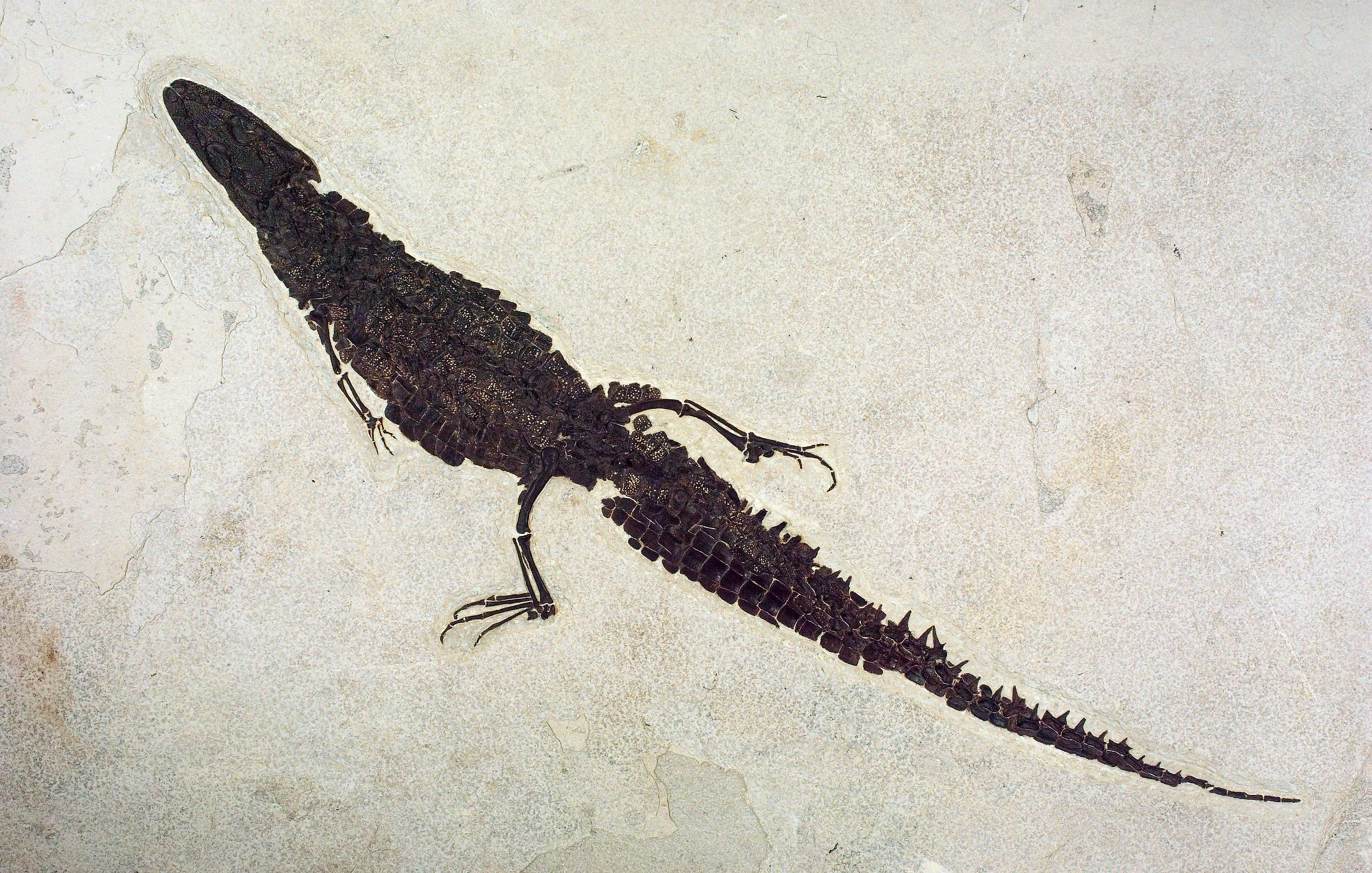
- Tsoabichi greenriverensis cast at Fossil Butte National Monument, Lincoln County, Wyoming

Scientific classification
- Kingdom: Animalia
- Phylum: Chordata
- Class: Reptilia
- Clade: Archosauria
- Order: Crocodilia
- Family: Alligatoridae
- Subfamily: Caimaninae
- Genus: †Tsoabichi; Brochu, 2010

Type species
- †Tsoabichi greenriverensis Brochu, 2010

= Tsoabichi =

Tsoabichi Temporal range: Eocene: Ypresian, 56–47.8 Ma

Extinct genus of reptiles

Tsoabichi (from Shoshone "tso'abichi'", meaning "monster") is an extinct genus of caimanine crocodylian. Fossils are known from the Green River Formation in Wyoming, and date back to the Ypresian stage of the Eocene (Wasatchian stage of North American age). The genus was named and described in 2010 by paleontologist Christopher A. Brochu, with the type species being Tsoabichi greenriverensis. According to the current understanding of caiman evolutionary relationships, Tsoabichi is a basal member of Caimaninae and may have evolved after caimans dispersed into North America from northern and central South America, their main center of diversity in the Cenozoic.

== Description ==
Some living caimans such as the Spectacled Caiman have a "spectacle", or a bony ridge between the eyes. Tsoabichi lacks a spectacle, but it does have three smaller ridges between the orbits, or eye sockets. In Tsoabichi, distinct rims are seen around the supratemporal fenestrae, two holes on the skull table. Much of the supraoccipital bone is also found on the skull table, and forms a V-shape. To either side of the V-shaped supraoccipitals are the parietal bones, which form the posterior margin of the skull table. Along the snout, the nasal bone forms a thin ridge, and narrows as it approaches the external naris where the nostrils are located.

The dorsal osteoderms (bony scutes along the back) are wider than those of other caimans. Some have two keels on their outer surface. Tsoabichi also has bipartite ventral osteoderms on its underside.

== Phylogeny ==
Tsoabichi was included in a phylogenetic analysis when it was described in 2010. Brochu (2010) found it to be a basal member of Caimaninae closely related to the living genus Paleosuchus. The analysis of Hastings et al. (2013), which included several more species of caimans, also placed Tsoabichi in a basal position within Caimaninae as the sister taxon to crown group caimans (the smallest clade that includes all living caimans and their most recent common ancestor). Eocaiman and Culebrasuchus were successively more basal than Tsoabichi, as shown in the cladogram below:

- - †Stangerochampsa mccabei
  - - †Brachychampsa montana
    - †Brachychampsa sealeyi
  - Alligatoridae
    - Alligatorinae
    - Caimaninae
      - †Culebrasuchus mesoamericanus
      - - †Eocaiman cavernensis
        - - †Tsoabichi greenriverensis
          - crown group caimans
            - - Paleosuchus palpebrosus Cuvier's dwarf caiman
              - Paleosuchus trigonatus Smooth-fronted caiman
            - - - †Centenariosuchus gilmorei
                - - †Purussaurus neivensis
                  - - †Mourasuchus
                    - †Orthogenysuchus olseni
              - - - Caiman crocodilus Spectacled caiman
                  - Caiman yacare Yacare caiman
                - - Caiman latirostris Broad-snouted caiman
                  - †Caiman lutescens
                  - - †Melanosuchus fisheri
                    - Melanosuchus niger Black caiman

== Biogeography ==
Tsoabichi is one of the few caimanines known to have lived north of what is now Mexico; the majority of caimans living and extinct are known from Central and South America. Caimans are thought to have originated in North America in the Late Cretaceous, yet Tsoabichi most likely originated from a South American population that reentered North America in the Early Eocene. The route by which a population of caimans could have reached North America in the Early Eocene is unknown. A sea route is unlikely given that living caimans have low tolerance for salt water, yet North and South America were separated by a large expanse of ocean. A continuous land route would not appear until the Isthmus of Panama formed several tens of millions of years later in the Pliocene, and a potentially crossable island chain would not form until tectonic uplift between the two continents occurred in the Late Eocene. An alternative biogeographic explanation is that Tsoabichi descended from a population of ancestral caimans that never left North America, but this hypothesis is unlikely given that it would necessitate multiple independent dispersals into Central and South America (including one for Culebrasuchus, one for Eocaiman, one for Paleosuchus, and one for derived caimans).
