= Centenariosuchus =

Centenariosuchus Temporal range: Early-Mid Miocene (Hemingfordian) ~20.43–15.97 Ma

Scientific classification
- Domain: Eukaryota
- Kingdom: Animalia
- Phylum: Chordata
- Class: Reptilia
- Clade: Archosauromorpha
- Clade: Archosauriformes
- Order: Crocodilia
- Family: Alligatoridae
- Subfamily: Caimaninae
- Clade: Jacarea
- Genus: †Centenariosuchus; Hastings et al., 2013

Type species
- †Centenariosuchus gilmorei Hastings et al., 2013

Extinct genus of reptiles

Centenariosuchus is an extinct genus of caimanine crocodylian known from the Miocene of the Panama Canal Zone of Panama. It contains a single species, Centenariosuchus gilmorei, that was named in 2013 in honor of the upcoming centennial anniversary of the digging of the Panama Canal. Two fossil specimens consisting of skull fragments were found in the Early to Middle Miocene Cucaracha Formation in 2009 and 2011, and may belong to a single individual. The species is diagnosed by a combination of skull features that it shares with basal caimans like Tsoabichi, Eocaiman, Culebrasuchus, and the living genus Paleosuchus, as well as more derived caimans such as those in the genus Caiman. One feature that distinguishes Centenariosuchus from all other caimans is the straight outer margin of a hole on the underside of the skull called the suborbital fenestra. According to one phylogenetic analysis of caimanine relationships, Centenariosuchus falls within a clade or evolutionary grouping of caimans that includes the very large and highly specialized forms Purussaurus and Mourasuchus, known from the Miocene of South America.

== See also ==
- Culebrasuchus
- Purussaurus
