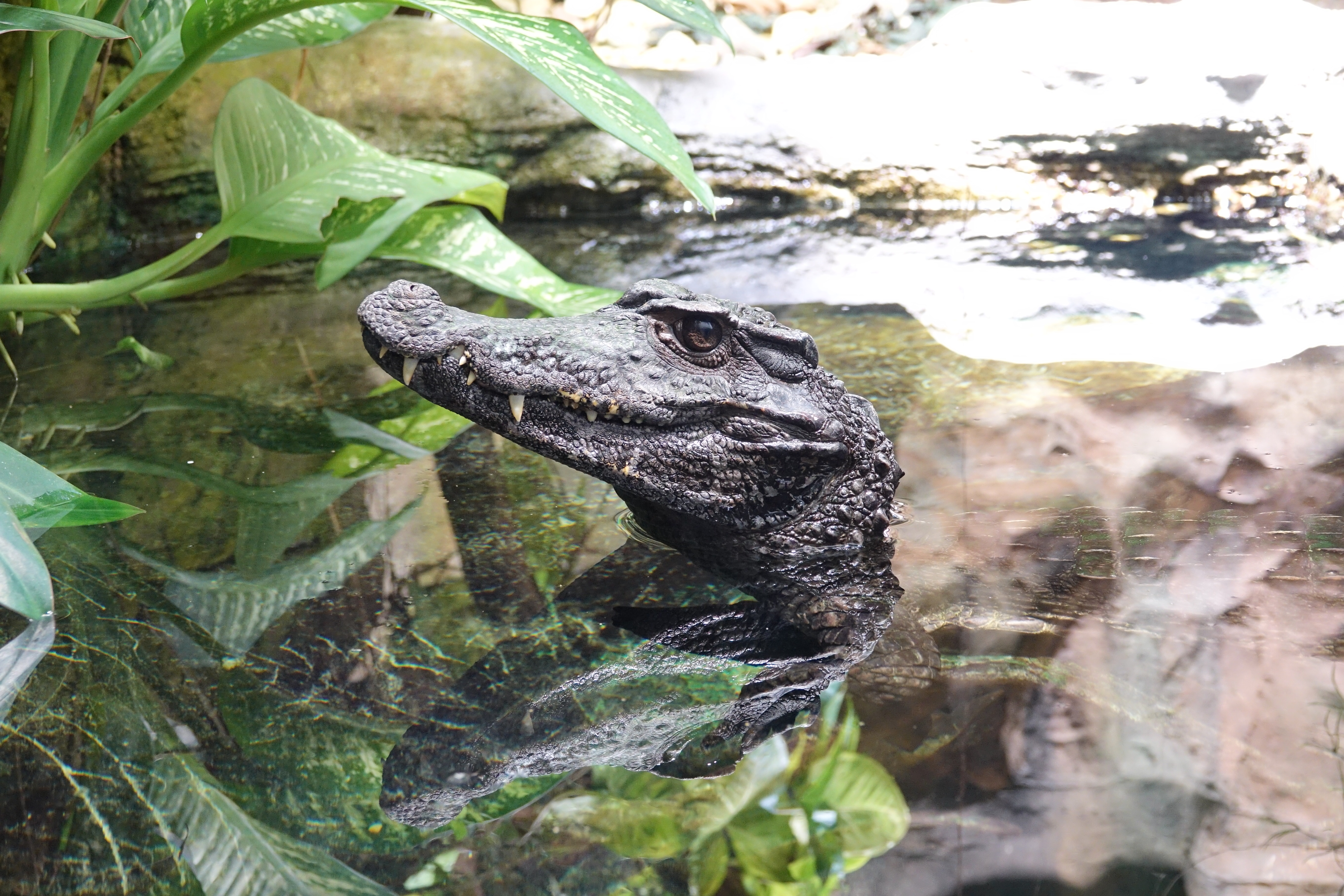
- A smooth-fronted caiman at Zoologischer Garten Berlin in Berlin, Germany

Conservation status
- Least Concern (IUCN 3.1)
- CITES Appendix II

Scientific classification
- Kingdom: Animalia
- Phylum: Chordata
- Class: Reptilia
- Order: Crocodylia
- Family: Alligatoridae
- Subfamily: Caimaninae
- Genus: Paleosuchus
- Species: P. trigonatus

Binomial name
- Paleosuchus trigonatus (Schneider, 1801)
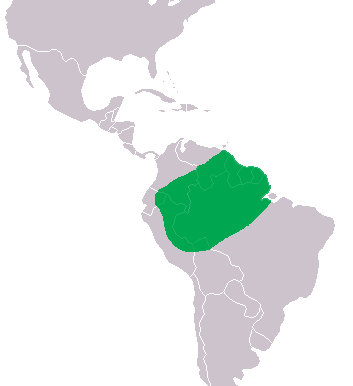
- Smooth-fronted caiman distribution (green)

Synonyms
- List: Crocodilus (Alligator) trigonatus (Merrem, 1820); Champsa trigonata (Wagler, 1830); Alligator palpebrosus (Dumeril and Bibron, 1836); Caiman trigonatus (Gray, 1844); Caiman (Paleosuchus) trigonatus (Gray, 1862); Jacaretinga trigonatus (Vaillant, 1898); Paleosuchus niloticus (Muller, 1924); Crocodylus niloticus (Werner, 1933)

= Smooth-fronted caiman =

Smooth-fronted caiman Temporal range: Late Pleistocene - Recent, 0.1–0 Ma

Species of reptile

The smooth-fronted caiman (Paleosuchus trigonatus), also known as Schneider's dwarf caiman or Schneider's smooth-fronted caiman, is a crocodilian from South America, where it is native to the Amazon and Orinoco Basins. It is the second-smallest species of the family Alligatoridae, the smallest being Cuvier's dwarf caiman, also from tropical South America and in the same genus. An adult typically grows to around 1.2 to 1.6 m (3.9 to 5.2 ft) in length and weighs between 9 and 20 kg (20 and 44 lb). Exceptionally large males can reach as much as 2.3 m (7.5 ft) in length and 36 kg (79 lb) in weight.

== Etymology ==
The smooth-fronted caiman was first described by the German classicist and naturalist Johann Gottlob Schneider in 1801. The genus name Paleosuchus is derived from the Greek palaios meaning "ancient" and soukhos meaning "crocodile". This refers to the belief that this crocodile comes from an ancient lineage that diverged from other species of caimans some 30 million years ago. The specific name trigonatus is derived from the Greek trigonos meaning "three-cornered" and Latin atus meaning "provided with" and refers to the triangular shape of the head.

== Classification ==
At present, the genus Paleosuchus contains only one other member: Cuvier's dwarf caiman (Paleosuchus palpebrosus), also from South America. Paleosuchus is distinguished from other caimans in the subfamily Caimaninae by the absence of an interorbital ridge and the presence of four teeth in the premaxilla region of the jaw, where other species of caimans have five. The relationships of extant (living) caimans can be shown in the cladogram below, based on molecular DNA-based phylogenetic studies:

- Alligatoridae
  - Caimaninae
    - - Paleosuchus palpebrosus Cuvier's dwarf caiman
      - Paleosuchus trigonatus Schneider's dwarf caiman
    - Jacarea
      - - - Caiman crocodilus Spectacled caiman
          - Caiman yacare Yacare caiman
        - Caiman latirostris Broad-snouted caiman
      - Melanosuchus niger Black caiman
  - Alligatorinae
    - Alligator sinensis Chinese alligator
    - Alligator mississippiensis American alligator

== Description ==
The head of the smooth-fronted caiman is similar in appearance to that of the spectacled caiman (Caiman crocodilus), but no bony ridge or "spectacle" occurs between the eyes. The scutes on the back of the neck and the tail are large, triangular, and sharp. It has heavily ossified body armour on both its dorsal and ventral surfaces. The relatively short tail is broad at its base and flattened dorsoventrally in contrast to most species of crocodilians which have laterally flattened tails. The bony scutes on the tail have sideways projections; and the tail is so well armoured, that it is relatively inflexible. This caiman is a dark greyish-brown with mid-brown eyes. Males grow to about 1.7 to 2.3 m (5 ft 7 in to 7 ft 7 in) long, with the largest recorded specimen being 2.6 m (8 ft 6 in). Females do not often exceed 1.4 m (4 ft 7 in). It is a robust crocodilian, strong for its size, and tends to carry its head high with its neck angled upwards.

== Distribution and habitat ==
The smooth-fronted caiman is native to the Amazon and Orinoco Basins in South America and is found in Bolivia, Brazil, Colombia, Ecuador, French Guiana, Guyana, Peru, Suriname, and Venezuela. It inhabits small streams in forested areas where in some cases, the water may be insufficiently deep for it to completely submerge itself. It is seldom seen in open areas and does not usually bask in the sun, even in captivity.

== Behaviour and life history ==
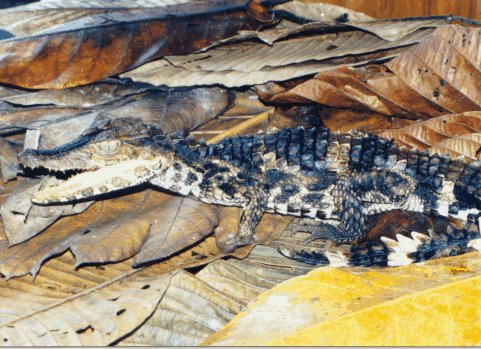
A juvenile smooth-fronted caiman in Peru

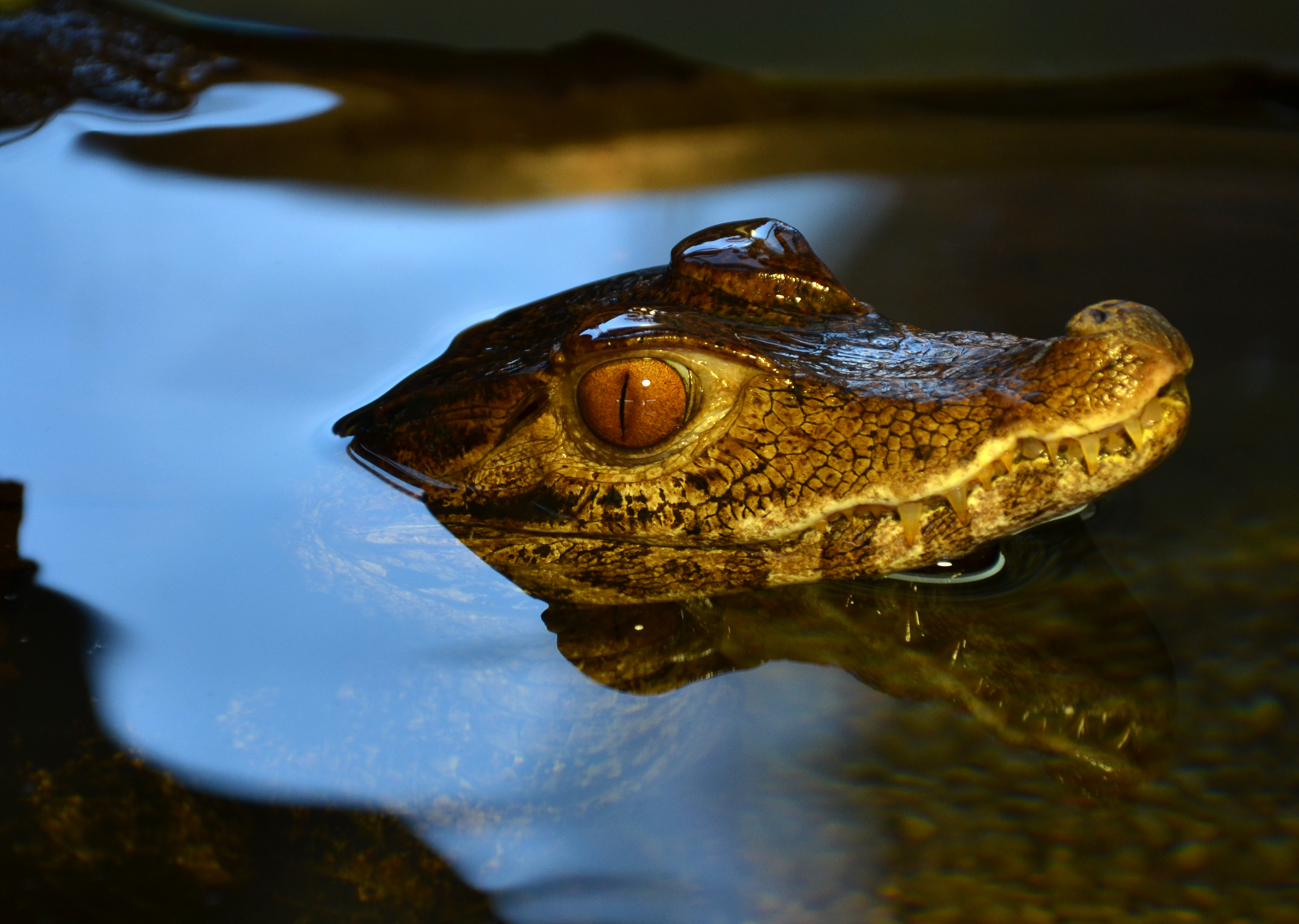
In captivity

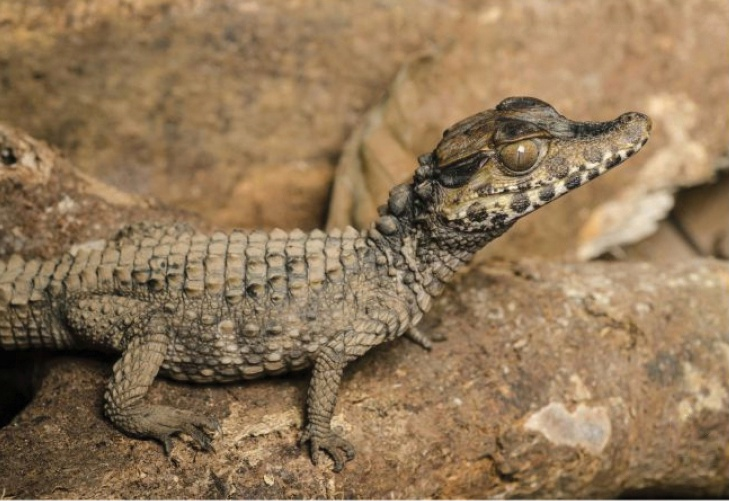
Baby, Serra da Mocidade

The adult smooth-fronted caiman has cryptic habits and is seldom observed by day because it hides in underwater burrows or may spend much of its time up to 100 m (330 ft) away from water, concealed in dense undergrowth, in hollow logs, or under fallen trees. Males are territorial and females have small home ranges. Adults are semiterrestrial and mainly feed on such animals as porcupines, pacas, snakes, birds, and lizards, consuming few fish or molluscs. Hatchlings feed mainly on insects and other arthropods in their first few weeks, graduating to larger prey as they grow, such as small fish, birds, and reptiles. Juvenile mortality is high, but adult mortality is low, although large carnivores such as the jaguar sometimes prey on them.

Females become mature and start to breed at about 11 years and males at about 20. The female builds a large mound nest out of leaf litter and soil at the end of the dry season or may use a pre-existing nest. A clutch of 10 to 15 eggs is laid and covered with further nesting material. Some heat is generated by the decaying vegetation and good insulation helps to retain this. The nests are often built against the sides of termite mounds and metabolic heat generated by the termites helps to maintain the clutch at a near constant temperature. The eggs need to be maintained at a temperature of 31 to 32 °C (88 to 90 °F) for the production of male offspring. The incubation period is about 115 days and the female caiman remains near the nest for at least the earlier part of this time, providing protection against predators. During incubation, roots may grow through the nest, and soil from the termite mound may cement the eggs together. This means parental assistance is necessary when the eggs hatch to enable the hatchlings to escape from the nest chamber. Having transported the newly emerged juveniles to a nursery area, the female stays with them for a few weeks after which time they disperse. The female may miss a year before breeding again.

== Status and conservation ==
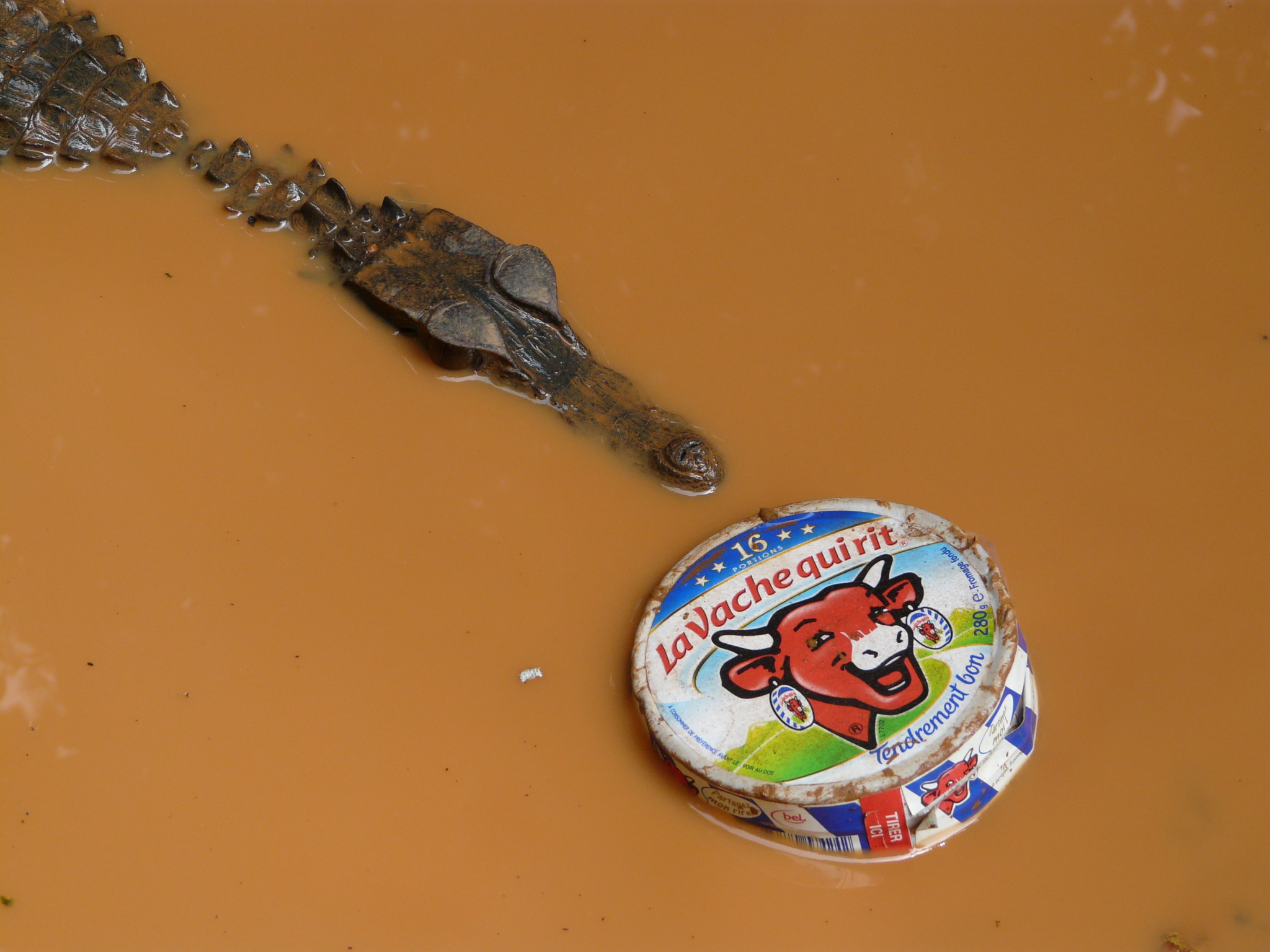
With human trash in Suriname

The smooth-fronted caiman is not extensively hunted because its skin contains many bony scutes, which make it of little use for leather. The animals are collected in Guyana, however, for the pet trade. The main threats to this species are destruction of its forest habitat and pollution of its environment by gold mining activities. Over one million individuals are estimated to remain in the wild, and the species is rated by the IUCN as being of least concern. It is listed on Appendix II of CITES which is designed to limit overexploitation through international trade.
