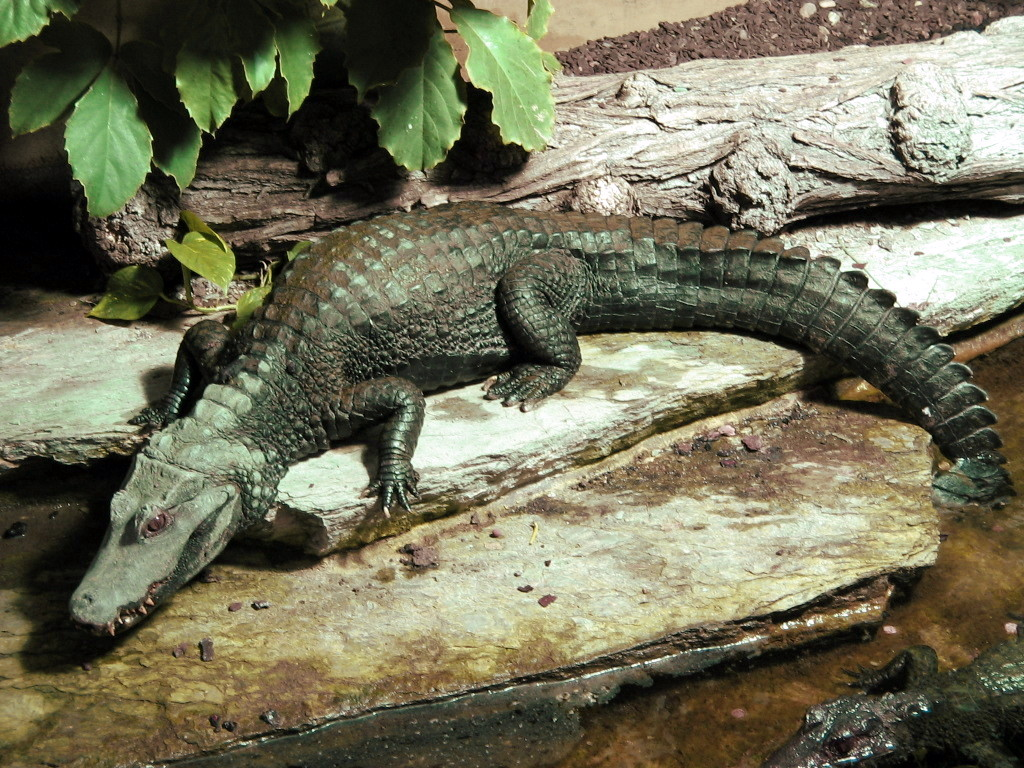
- Paleosuchus palpebrosus

Scientific classification
- Kingdom: Animalia
- Phylum: Chordata
- Class: Reptilia
- Order: Crocodylia
- Family: Alligatoridae
- Subfamily: Caimaninae
- Genus: Paleosuchus; Gray, 1862

Species
- Paleosuchus palpebrosus; Paleosuchus trigonatus

= Paleosuchus =

Paleosuchus Temporal range: Late Pleistocene - Recent, 0.1–0 Ma

Genus of reptiles

Paleosuchus (from Ancient Greek παλαιός (palaiós), meaning "old", and Σοῦχος (Soûkhos), meaning "Sobek") is a South American genus of reptiles in the subfamily Caimaninae of the family Alligatoridae. They are the smallest members of the order Crocodilia in the Americas.

== Classification ==
The genus name Paleosuchus is derived from the Greek palaios meaning "ancient" and soukhos meaning "crocodile god Sobek". This refers to the belief that this crocodilian comes from an ancient lineage that diverged from other species of caimans some 30 million years ago.

At present, Paleosuchus contains only two members: the smooth-fronted or Schneider's dwarf caiman (Paleosuchus trigonatus) and Cuvier's dwarf caiman (Paleosuchus palpebrosus), both from South America.

Paleosuchus is distinguished from other caimans in the subfamily Caimaninae by the absence of an interorbital ridge and the presence of four teeth in the premaxilla region of the jaw, where other species of caimans have five. The relationships of extant (living) caimans can be shown in the cladogram below, based on molecular DNA-based phylogenetic studies:

- Alligatoridae
  - Caimaninae
    - - Paleosuchus palpebrosus Cuvier's dwarf caiman
      - Paleosuchus trigonatus Schneider's dwarf caiman
    - Jacarea
      - - - Caiman crocodilus Spectacled caiman
          - Caiman yacare Yacare caiman
        - Caiman latirostris Broad-snouted caiman
      - Melanosuchus niger Black caiman
  - Alligatorinae
    - Alligator sinensis Chinese alligator
    - Alligator mississippiensis American alligator

== Species ==
The genus contains the following two extant species and a yet unnamed fossil species.

Genus Paleosuchus – Gray, 1862 – two species
Common name	Scientific name and subspecies	Range	Size and ecology	IUCN status and estimated population
Cuvier's dwarf caiman	Paleosuchus palpebrosus Cuvier, 1807	Bolivia, Brazil, Colombia, Ecuador, French Guiana, Guyana, Paraguay, Peru, Suriname, Trinidad, and Venezuela	Size: Habitat: Diet:	LC
Smooth-fronted caiman	Paleosuchus trigonatus (Schneider, 1801)	Amazon and Orinoco Basins	Size: Habitat: Diet:	LC
