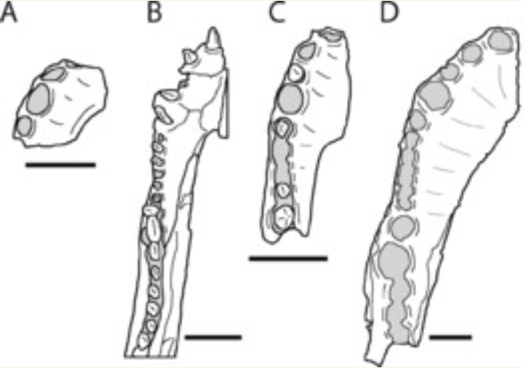
- Left dentaries of Eocaiman: E. cavernensis (A), E. itaboraiensis (B), E. palaeocenicus (C), and the specimen formerly known as Notocaiman stromeri (D)

Scientific classification
- Kingdom: Animalia
- Phylum: Chordata
- Class: Reptilia
- Order: Crocodylia
- Family: Alligatoridae
- Subfamily: Caimaninae
- Genus: †Eocaiman; Simpson 1933

Type species
- †Eocaiman cavernensis Simpson, 1933

Other species
- †Eocaiman itaboraiensis Pinheiro et al, 2013; †Eocaiman palaeocenicus Bona, 2007

Synonyms
- Notocaiman stromeri Rusconi, 1937

= Eocaiman =

Eocaiman Temporal range: Early Paleocene - Middle Miocene, 66–13.8 Ma

Extinct genus of reptiles

Eocaiman is an extinct genus of caiman containing species living from the Early Paleocene to Miocene in what is now Argentina (Salamanca and Sarmiento Formations), Itaboraí Formation of Brazil and Colombia (Honda Group). Eocaiman contains three described species: E. cavernensis, E. palaeocenicus, and E. itaboraiensis, and is typically recovered as one of the more basal members of Caimaninae. Notocaiman was synonymized with Eocaiman paleocenicus in 2022.
