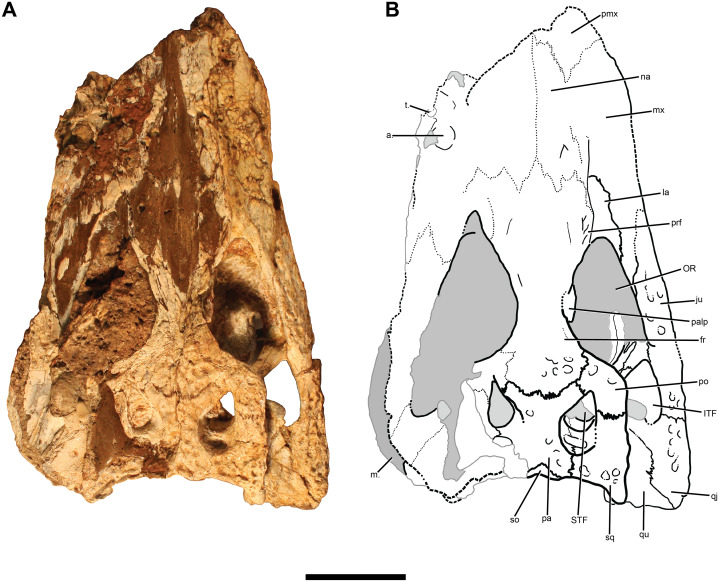
- Holotype skull of Chintanichampsus wilsonorum.

Scientific classification
- Kingdom: Animalia
- Phylum: Chordata
- Class: Reptilia
- Clade: Archosauria
- Order: Crocodilia
- Family: Alligatoridae
- Subfamily: Caimaninae
- Genus: †Chinatichampsus; Stocker, Brochu, & Kirk, 2021

Species
- †Chinatichampsus wilsonorum Stocker, Brochu & Kirk, 2021 (type)

= Chinatichampsus =

Chinatichampsus Temporal range: Eocene: late Uintan – early Duchesnean, 42.8–41.5 Ma

Extinct genus of reptiles

Chinatichampsus ("Chinati Mountains crocodile") is an extinct genus of alligatorid from Texas. A single specimen, consisting of a partial skull, was discovered in 2010, in strata from the Eocene-aged (42.8–41.5 Ma) Devil's Graveyard Formation. The specimen was probably mature judging by its size and the shape and size of the fenestrae (skull holes). It was described and named in 2021 by a team consisting of Michelle R. Stocker, Christopher A. Brochu, and E. Christopher Kirk. One species of Chinatichampsus, C. wilsonorum, has been named. Chinatichampsus was initially recovered as the most basal Eocene caimanine, part of the alligatorid subfamily which includes modern caimans, though a subsequent analysis found it to be part of a caimanine stem group including Gnatusuchus and Protocaiman.

== History of discovery ==
The holotype of Chinatichampsus, TMM 45911–1, consists of a skull, minus the lower jaw and most of the left dorsal (upper) surface. The left premaxilla is missing, and most of the left side of the cranium, as well as the right premaxilla, right nasal and right prefrontal, are also entirely absent. The specimen was discovered in 2010, in the Midwestern State University's Dalquest Desert Research Site. Strata from this locality are assigned to the Devil's Graveyard Formation, and the conglomeratic sandstones in which TM 45911-1 was discovered have been dated to between 42.8 and 41.5 million years ago. This corresponds to the late Uintan–early Duchesnean faunal stages. The fossil locality in which it was discovered has been nicknamed "Crocolicious". Upon collection, TM 45911-1 was transported to the Jackson School Museum of Earth History in Austin, Texas. In 2021, Michelle R. Stocker, Christopher A. Brochu, and E. Christopher Kirk assigned the specimen to a new genus and species, Chinatichampsus wilsonorum.

The generic name, Chinatichampsus is derived from the Chinati Mountains and the Greek champsus (crocodile). The specific epithet, wilsonorum, honours Cornelia and Samuel Wilson, the discoverers of the holotype specimen.

== Description ==
Though no parts of TM 45911-1's postcranial skeleton were recovered, its describers hypothesize that it is a morphologically mature individual, older than two years of age, due to the size of the cranium and the proportions of the cranial fenestrae.

=== Skull ===
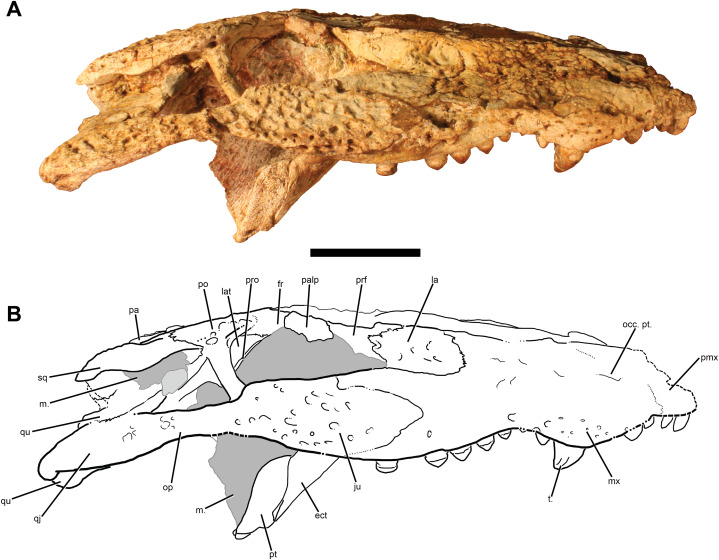
Right lateral view of Chinatichampsus wilsonorum's skull.

None of the external bone of the left maxilla remains, and only the medial surface of the large third or fourth left maxillary tooth and traces of the posterior maxillary alveoli are present. Remnants of matrix infillings of the nasal passage and maxillary sinus are visible, though. The right maxilla does preserve most of its external surface, though the outermost bony surface is either missing or crushed. Where the premaxillae and maxillae connect to the nasals, there is a prominent crest, differing from the preorbital and rostral ridges observed in other caimanines in that it is oriented anteroposteriorly (from front-to-back), rather than anterolaterally (from the front to the sides) or mediolaterally (from the middle to the sides). Most of the dorsal surfaces of nasals are entirely missing. Along the cranium's midline are paired moulds of the grooved ventral (bottom) surfaces of the nasals. The anteriorly (forwardly) elongated nasals appear to have tapered slightly towards their anterior articulations with the maxillae and premaxillae. Though the anteriormost portion of the cranium is not very well-preserved, it seems there was at least a slight projection of the nasals beyond the posterior extent of the naris. Whether an internarial bar would have entirely bisected the nares is unclear.

The pterygoid bones of Chinatichampsus were robust and roughly trapezoidal when viewed ventrally. They are wider posteriorly (towards the back) than anteriorly, and form the entire posterior margin of the suborbital fenestrae. The pterygoids completely surround the choanae, or internal nostrils. These choanae project anteroventrally (forward, towards the bottom) and have posterior edges that have raised because of a surrounding concavity. A deep notch bisects the posterior edge. The choanal septum is not visible in lateral view.

Between thirteen and fifteen maxillary teeth are preserved; the number of teeth and their positions is ambiguous due to the position of the maxillary-premaxillary suture and the presence of a small hole at the posterior (rear) end of the maxillary tooth row. Assuming the largest preserved alveolus is the fourth, and that it is indeed an alveolus, there would be fifteen maxillary teeth. The posterior maxillary teeth are rounded and slightly bulbous with the posteriormost preserved tooth being almost fungiform (bulbous, mushroom-shaped).

== Taxonomy ==
Both Chitanichampsus and the slightly more derived Eocaiman share several characters plesiomorphic for crown-caimanines and Necrosuchus including the presence of posterior maxillary processes between the lacrimal and prefrontal, an extension of the quadratojugal with the dorsal angle of the infratemporal fenestra, and a small supraoccipital exposure on the skull table. It can be differentiated from Eocaiman because of the rounded shape of the expanded anterior margins of the palatines, rather than the quadrangular anterior margins of Eocaiman.

Chinatichampsus was originally believed to have affinities with the Alligatorinae, partly based on comparisons with a currently undescribed alligatorid. In contrast, the phylogenetic analysis of Stocker, Brochu, and Kirk found that Chinatichampsus was of the most basal caimanines, branching off before Protocaiman, but after Brachychampsa, Stangerochampsa and Albertochampsa.

Below is a phylogenetic tree by Stocker, Brochu, and Kirk (2021):

- Caimaninae
  - - Stangerochampsa mccabei
    - Albertochampsa langstoni
    - - Brachychampsa montana
      - Brachychampsa sealeyi
  - - Chinatichampsus wilsonorum
    - - Protocaiman peligrensis
      - - Gnatusuchus pebasensis
        - - - Eocaiman cavernensis
            - Eocaiman palaeocenicus
            - Eocaiman itaboraiensis
          - - - Globidentosuchus brachyrostris
              - Kuttanacaiman iquitosensis
            - - Centenariosuchus gilmorei
              - - Purussaurus
                - Mourasuchus
              - - Necrosuchus ionensis
                - - Tsoabichi greenriverensis
                  - Bottosaurus harlani
                - Paleosuchus
              - Caiman + Melanosuchus

A subsequent analysis, conducted by Jules Walter and colleagues later that year, recovered Chinatisuchus in one of two positions: either a similar one to that recovered by Stocker, Brochu, and Kirk, or one in which it formed a stem-group clade alongside Gnatusuchus and Protocaiman.
