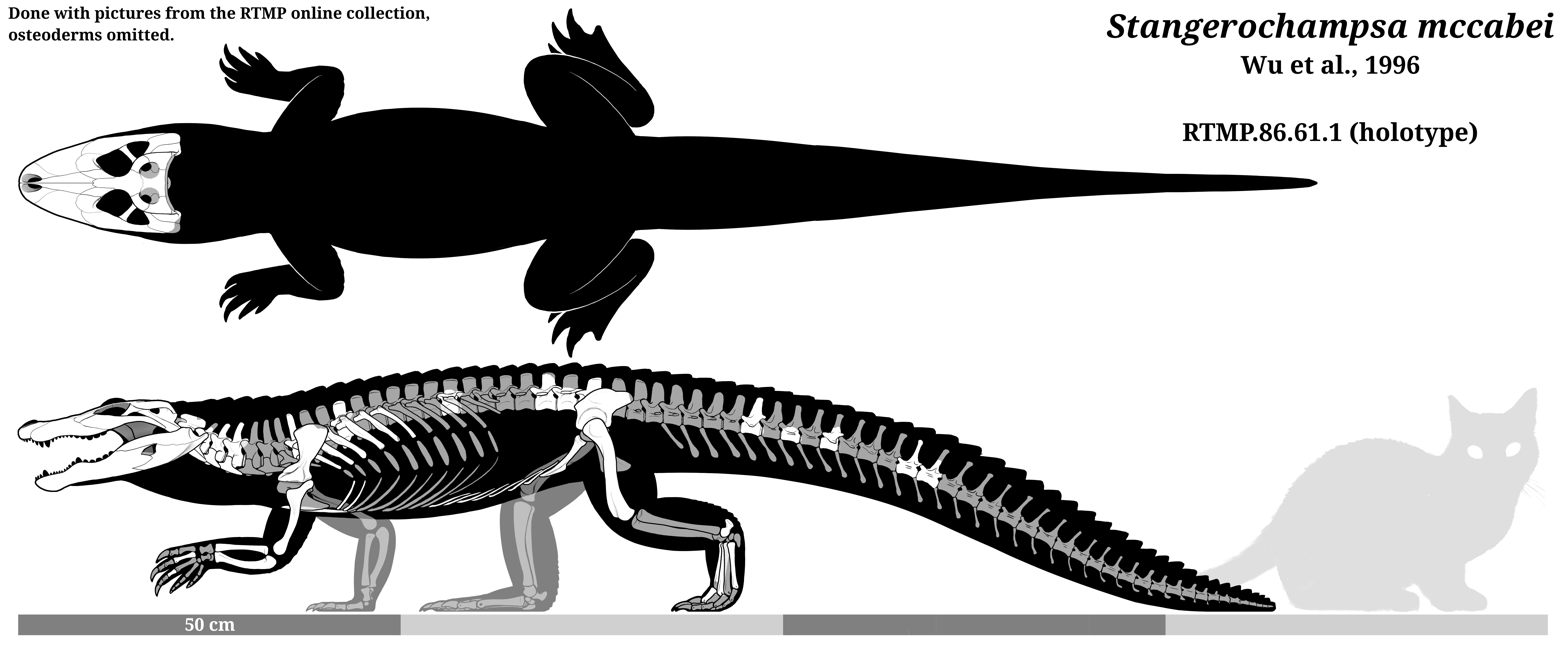
- Skeletal reconstruction of the holotype
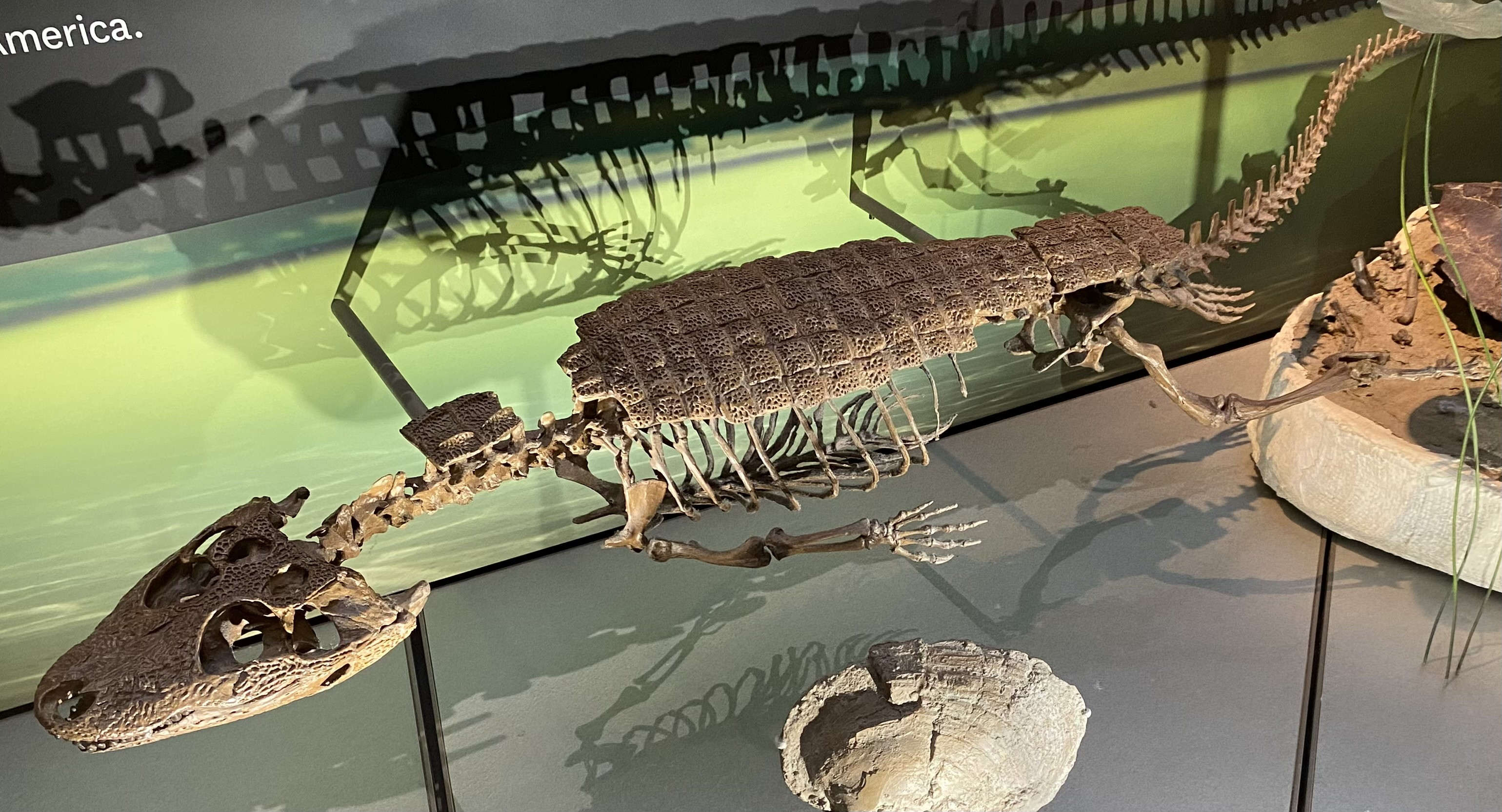
- Skeletal mount on display at the Smithsonian National Museum of Natural History

Scientific classification
- Kingdom: Animalia
- Phylum: Chordata
- Class: Reptilia
- Order: Crocodylia
- Clade: Globidonta
- Family: Alligatoridae
- Genus: †Stangerochampsa; Wu et al., 1996

Type species
- †Stangerochampsa mccabei Wu et al., 1996

= Stangerochampsa =

Stangerochampsa Temporal range: Late Cretaceous, 70.6–66 Ma

Extinct genus of reptiles

Stangerochampsa is an extinct genus of alligatorid, possibly an alligatorine or a stem-caiman, from the Late Cretaceous of Alberta. It is based on RTMP.86.61.1, a skull, partial lower jaws, and partial postcranial skeleton discovered in the late Campanian–early Maastrichtian-age Horseshoe Canyon Formation. Stangerochampsa was described in 1996 by Wu and colleagues. The type species is S. mccabei. The generic name honors the Stanger family, the owners of the ranch where the specimen was found, and the species name honors James Ross McCabe, who discovered, collected, and prepared it. Stangerochampsa is described as "small to medium–sized"; the type skull is 20.0 centimetres (7.9 in) long from the tip of the snout to the occipital condyle, and is 13.0 centimetres (5.1 in) wide at its greatest, while the thigh bone is 14.2 centimetres (5.6 in) long. It had heterodont dentition, with large crushing teeth at the rear of the jaws.

== Classification ==
Wu and colleagues, using phylogenetic analyses, found their new genus to be closest to Brachychampsa, and then Albertochampsa and Hylaeochampsa successively, as part of a clade within Alligatorinae that also included Allognathosuchus, Ceratosuchus, and Wannaganosuchus. This arrangement also unites most Mesozoic and Paleogene alligatorines. Brochu (1999), in an analysis of all alligatoroids, found Stangerochampsa and Brachychampsa to be just outside Alligatoridae, and suggested that Stangerochampsa and Albertochampsa were synonymous. Brochu (2004) and Hill and Lucas (2006) also found Stangerochampsa to be outside of Alligatorinae; Hill and Lucas found Albertochampsa to its sister taxon.

Below is a cladogram based on the results of a 2018 tip dating study by Lee & Yates that simultaneously used morphological, molecular (DNA sequencing), and stratigraphic (fossil age) data, which shows Stangerochampsa's placement within Globidonta.

- Crocodylia
  - Alligatoroidea
    - Leidyosuchus†
    - - Diplocynodontinae†
        Diplocynodon†
      - Globidonta
        - - Stangerochampsa†
          - Brachychampsa†
        - - Navajosuchus†
          - Alligatoridae
            - Caimaninae
              - - Caiman
                - Melanosuchus
              - Paleosuchus
            - Alligatorinae
              Alligator
  - - extinct basal Crocodilians† (including Mekosuchinae†)
    - Longirostres
      - Crocodyloidea
        - extinct basal crocodiles†
        - Crocodylidae
      - Gavialoidea
        - extinct basal Gavialoids†
        - Gavialidae
          - Gavialis
          - Tomistoma

On the other hand, in the phylogenetic analysis conducted by Bona et al. (2018) Stangerochampsa was recovered as an alligatorid, specifically as a stem-caiman, as shown in the cladogram below.

- Alligatoroidea (stem-based group)
  - Leidyosuchus†
  - - Diplocynodon†
    - Alligatoridae (crown group)
      - Alligatorinae (stem-based group)
        - Ceratosuchus†
        - Allognathosuchus†
        - Navajosuchus†
        - Arambourgia†
        - Procaimanoidea†
        - - Wannaganosuchus†
          - - Alligator prenasalis†
            - - Alligator mcgrewi†
              - - Alligator olseni†
                - - Alligator sinensis Chinese alligator
                  - - Culebrasuchus†
                    - - Alligator mississippiensis American alligator
                      - Alligator mefferdi†
                      - Alligator thomsoni†
      - Caimaninae (stem-based group)
        - - Stangerochampsa†
          - Albertochampsa†
          - Brachychampsa†
        - - Protocaiman†
          - - Gnatusuchus†
            - - Globidentosuchus†
              - - - Eocaiman†
                  - Notocaiman†
                - - Kuttanacaiman†
                  - - - Purussaurus†
                      - Mourasuchus†
                    - - - Necrosuchus†
                        - Tsoabichi†
                        - - Paleosuchus trigonatus Smooth-fronted caiman
                          - Paleosuchus palpebrosus Cuvier's dwarf caiman
                      - - Centenariosuchus†
                        - - - Caiman latirostris Broad-snouted caiman
                            - Melanosuchus niger Black caiman
                          - - - Caiman yacare Yacare caiman
                              - Caiman crocodilus Spectacled caiman
                            - - Caiman brevirostris†
                              - - La Venta Caiman†
                                - Caiman wannlangstoni†

Stangerochampsa was recovered as a stem-group caiman in 2021, but it was also recovered as a basal alligatorine in 2022.
