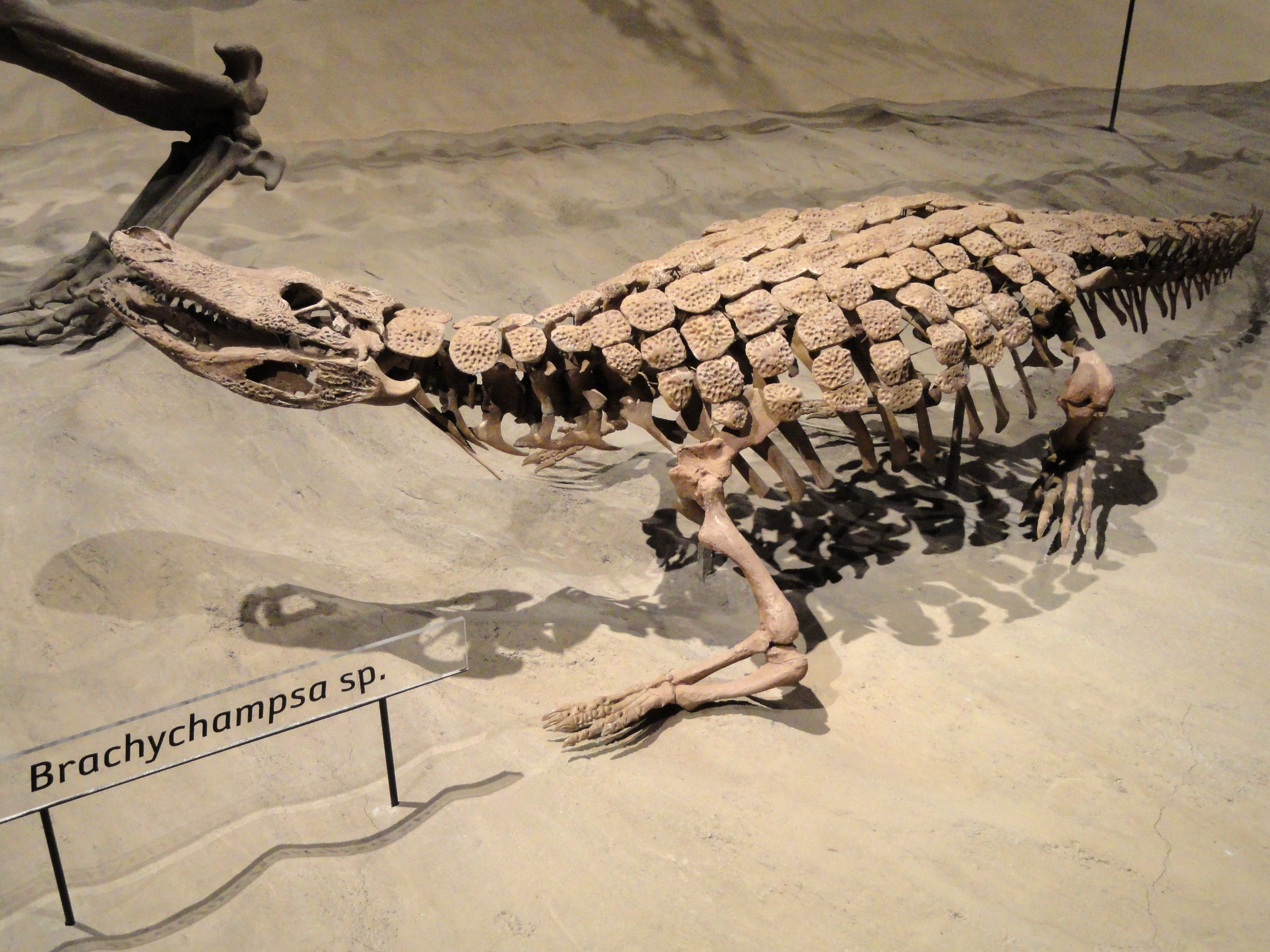
- Brachychampsa sp.
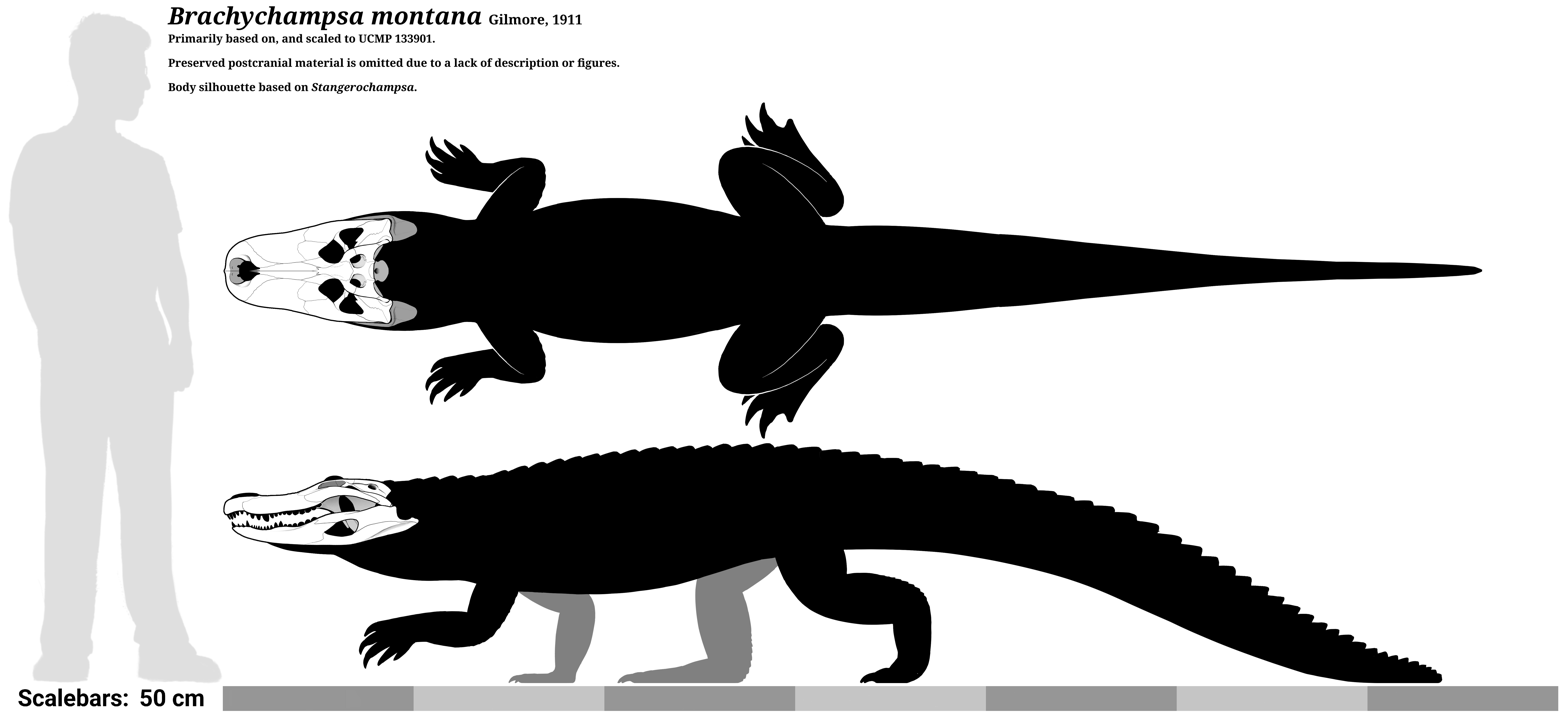
- Size comparison of the largest known specimen

Scientific classification
- Kingdom: Animalia
- Phylum: Chordata
- Class: Reptilia
- Order: Crocodylia
- Clade: Globidonta
- Family: Alligatoridae
- Genus: †Brachychampsa; Gilmore, 1911

Species
- †B. montana Gilmore, 1911 (type); †B. perrugosus (Cope, 1875); †?B. sealeyi Williamson, 1996

= Brachychampsa =

Brachychampsa Temporal range: Late Cretaceous, 72.1–66 Ma

Extinct genus of reptiles

Brachychampsa is an extinct genus of alligatorid, possibly a basal caiman. Specimens have been reported from New Mexico, Colorado, Wyoming, Montana, North and South Dakota, New Jersey, and Saskatchewan, though only those from Montana, Utah, and New Mexico are based on material sufficient to justify the referral. Some specimens have been reported from the Campanian-aged deposits of Central Asia (Chimkent of Kazakhstan and Kirkuduk of Tajikistan), although the species status is indeterminate for these fossils. The genus first appeared during the late Campanian stage of the Late Cretaceous (Judithian North American stage) and became extinct during the late Maastrichtian stage of the Cretaceous (Lancian North American Land Mammal "Age"). Brachychampsa is distinguished by an enlarged fifth maxillary tooth in the upper jaw.

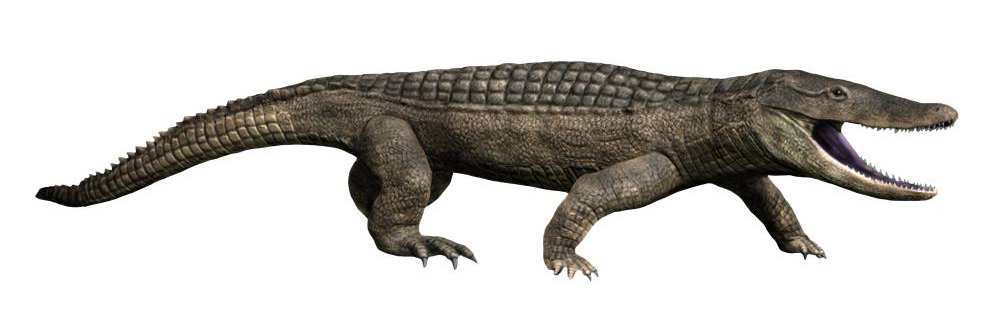
Life reconstruction of Brachychampsa montana

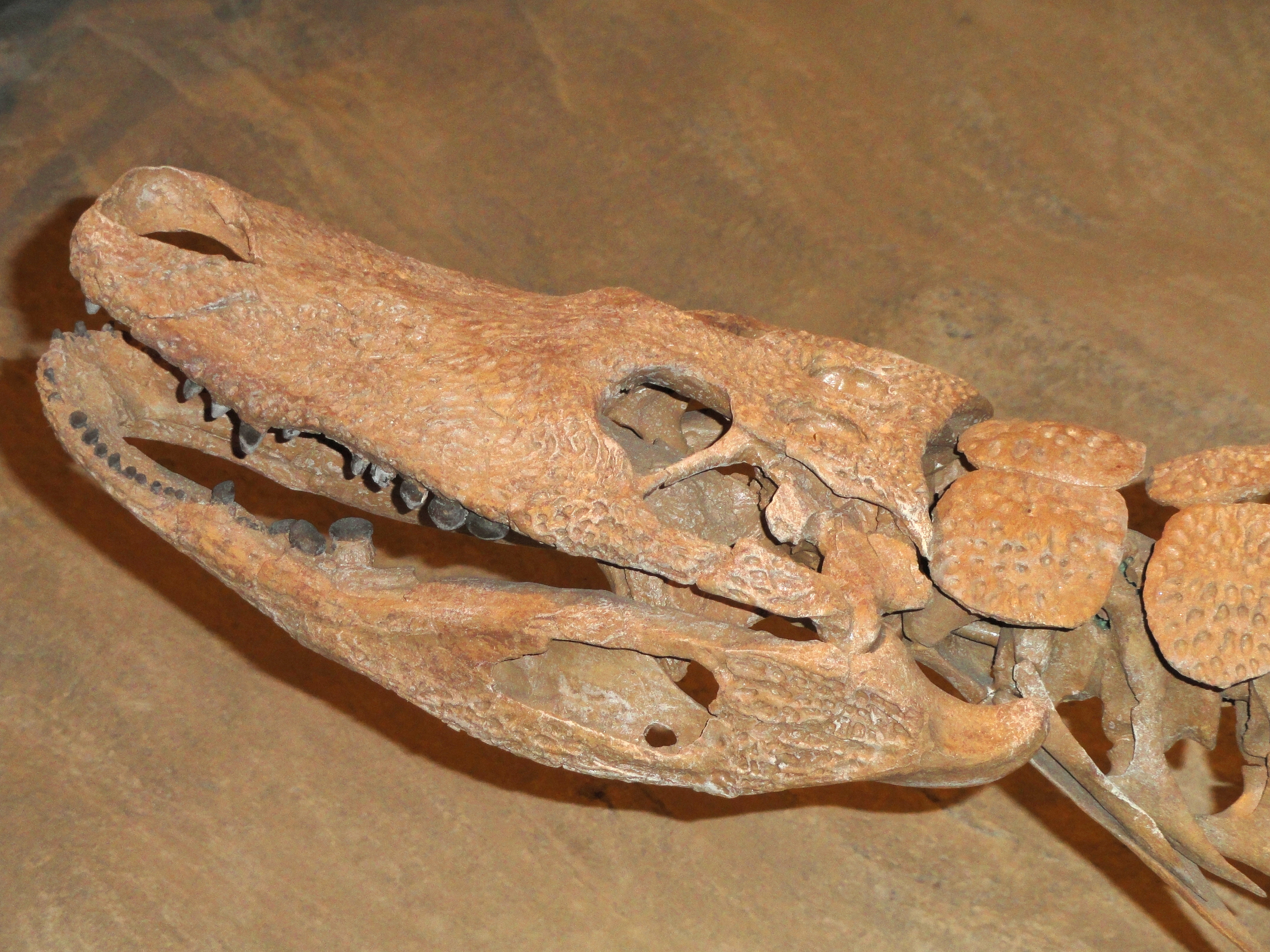
Skull

== Taxonomy ==
The type species of Brachychampsa is B. montana, first discovered from the Hell Creek Formation of Montana and described by Charles W. Gilmore in a paper in 1911. In that same paper, Gilmore recombined Bottosaurus perrugosus as a new species of Brachychampsa, called B. perrugosus. The holotype specimen of B. perrugosus went missing as the paper was being written, but it was later rediscovered and soon afterward designated as a nomen dubium due to a lack of diagnostic features that distinguish it from other alligatorids discovered since the paper was published. Another species from the Allison Member of the Menefee Formation of the San Juan Basin, B. sealeyi, was discovered in 1996, but was later argued to be synonymous with B. montana by interpreting it as an immature specimen of the latter species. However, other studies have shown that some of the variation seen between the two species, such as the orientation of the maxillary tooth row, are not ontogenic, thus making B. sealeyi a valid taxon.

== Phylogeny ==
Brachychampsa's position within Alligatoroidea has undergone many revisions since it was first named. Originally it was placed within Alligatoridae, and was later refined to the Alligatorinae in 1964, only to be placed outside both Alligatorinae and Alligatoridae (but still within Alligatoroidea) in 1994. Accordingly, studies have shown Brachychampsa as a basal member of Alligatoroidea, within the clade Globidonta, as shown in the cladogram below.

- Alligatoroidea
  - Diplocynodontinae†
  - Globidonta
    - Leidyosuchus†
    - - Deinosuchus†
      - - - Navajosuchus†
          - Ceratosuchus†
          - - Stangerochampsa†
            - - Brachychampsa sealeyi†
              - - Brachychampsa montana†
                - Orientalosuchina†
                  - Eoalligator†
                  - Jiangxisuchus†
                  - Protoalligator†
                  - - Orientalosuchus†
                    - Krabisuchus†
        - Alligatoridae
          - Alligatorinae
          - Caimaninae

Alternatively, other phylogenetic studies have recovered Brachychampsa as an alligatorid, specifically as a stem-caiman, as shown in the cladogram below.

- Alligatoroidea (stem-based group)
  - Leidyosuchus†
  - - Diplocynodon†
    - Alligatoridae (crown group)
      - Alligatorinae (stem-based group)
      - Caimaninae (stem-based group)
        - - Stangerochampsa†
          - Albertochampsa†
          - Brachychampsa†
        - - Protocaiman†
          - - Gnatusuchus†
            - - Globidentosuchus†
              - - - Eocaiman†
                  - Notocaiman†
                - - Kuttanacaiman†
                  - - - Purussaurus†
                      - Mourasuchus†
                    - crown Caimaninae

However, Walter et al. (2022) recovered Brachychampsa, Stangerochampsa and Albertochampsa as the basalmost alligatorines based on phylogenetic analysis and claimed that the earliest definitive stem-group caimans are known from the earliest Paleocene.

== Palaeoecology ==
Brachychampsa's dentition was heterodont, with conical teeth at the front and bulbous teeth at the back. It has been regarded as a specialist hunter of turtles, based on its rostral shape, massive dentary, and dental morphology, though this has been challenged over the years. A more generalist diet of small invertebrates and vertebrates has also been proposed. In 2003, Robert M. Sullivan and Spencer G. Lucas observed that most late Cretaceous turtles were probably too big for consumption, and that if they did represent a large portion of Brachychampsa's diet, it would have had to hunt either juveniles or smaller turtle species.
