= Orthogenysuchus =

Orthogenysuchus Temporal range: Early Eocene

Scientific classification
- Kingdom: Animalia
- Phylum: Chordata
- Class: Reptilia
- Order: Crocodylia
- Family: Alligatoridae
- Subfamily: Caimaninae
- Genus: †Orthogenysuchus; Mook, 1924

Type species
- †Orthogenysuchus olseni Mook, 1924

Extinct genus of reptiles

Orthogenysuchus is an extinct genus of caimanine alligatorids. Fossils have been found from the Wasatch Beds of the Willwood Formation of Wyoming, deposited during the early Eocene. The type species is O. olseni. The holotype, known as AMNH 5178, is the only known specimen belonging to the genus and consists of a skull lacking the lower jaws. The braincase is filled in by the matrix and most of the suture lines between bones are indiscernible, making comparisons with other eusuchian material difficult.

== Phylogeny ==
Orthogenysuchus was first named in 1924 by Charles C. Mook and was referred to as a eusuchian, although not to any particular eusuchian group known at the time. Later publications assigned the genus to the Crocodylidae, but more recent analyses propose that it is a pristichampsid or even a synonym of Pristichampsus. In 1999, Orthogenysuchus was placed within a new clade containing the Miocene caimanines Purussaurus and Mourasuchus. Orthogenysuchus antedates these genera by around 30 million years, suggesting that they both had significant ghost lineages.

Furthermore, the 1999 study proposed a clade containing only Orthogenysuchus and Mourasuchus. This clade is similar to the family Nettosuchidae, which was originally constructed in 1965 for Mourasuchus and the newly described Nettosuchus (later shown to be a junior synonym of the genus). However, the clade is based primarily on ambiguous characters as a result of the poor preservation of the holotype of Orthogenysuchus, thus has not yet been formally described. All unambiguous synapomorphies are based on the nasal region of the skull where the individual bones are easily distinguished. Orthogenysuchus shares with Mourasuchus a characteristically long, broad snout, extremely wide external nares consisting of the nasal aperture and dorsal fossa, and many small maxillary alveoli.

== Paleobiology ==
Orthogenysuchus is representative of the diverse Wasatchian faunas that occurred during the early Eocene in North America. These faunas are also characterized by the appearance or diversification of many chelonians such as emydids and testudinids, as well as the occurrence of rhineurid amphisbaenians. This followed a major faunal turnover at the Clarkforkian-Wasatchian boundary which resulted in the regional disappearance of champsosaurs and the extinction of the alligatorine Ceratosuchus.

The presence of Orthogenysuchus in North America during the Eocene suggests that a dispersal event occurred of caimans into the continent from South America after the original spread of early alligatorines and caimanines into South America that occurred during the Cretaceous–Paleogene boundary (Cretaceous–Tertiary boundary).
