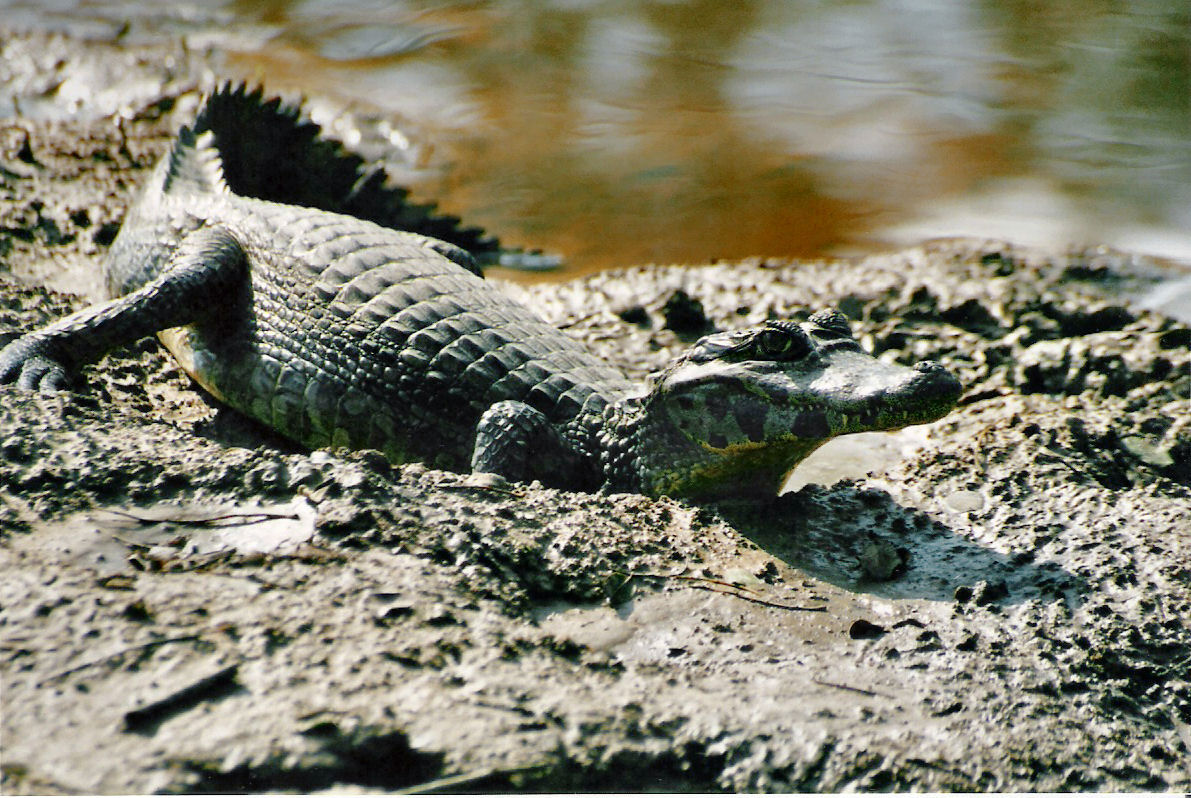
- Yacare caiman, Caiman yacare

Scientific classification
- Kingdom: Animalia
- Phylum: Chordata
- Class: Reptilia
- Order: Crocodylia
- Family: Alligatoridae
- Subfamily: Caimaninae; Brochu, 1999

Type genus
- Caiman Spix, 1825

Subgroups
- †Bottosaurus; †Chinatichampsus; †Culebrasuchus; †Eocaiman; †Globidentosuchus; †Gnatusuchus; †Kuttanacaiman; †Mourasuchus; †Necrosuchus; †Orthogenysuchus; Paleosuchus; †Paranacaiman; †Paranasuchus; †Protocaiman; †Tsoabichi; †Brachychampsini Cossette & Tarailo, 2024; †Albertochampsa; †Brachychampsa; †Chrysochampsa; †Stangerochampsa; Jacarea Norell, 1988; Caiman; Melanosuchus; †Acresuchus; †Centenariosuchus; †Necrosuchus; †Purussaurus

= Caiman =

Caimans Temporal range: Paleocene–Present Possible Maastrichtian origin if Late Cretaceous taxa are included

Subfamily of reptiles

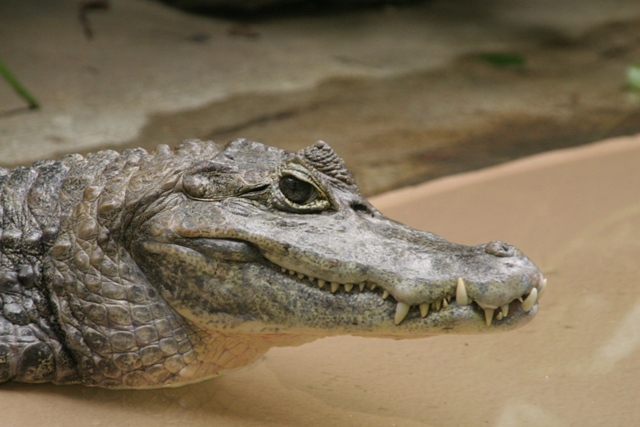
Spectacled caiman (Caiman crocodilus)

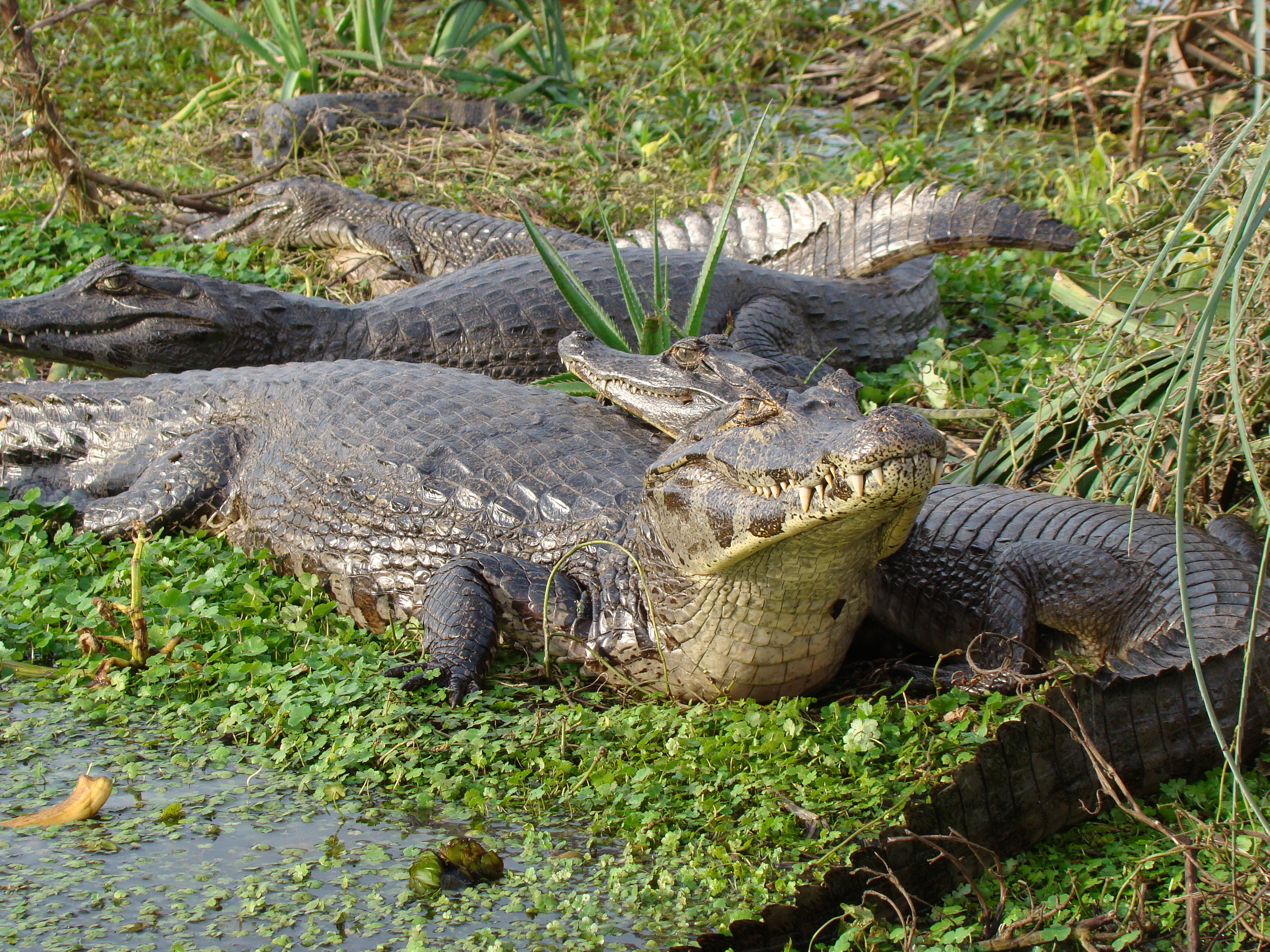
Yacare caiman (Caiman yacare)

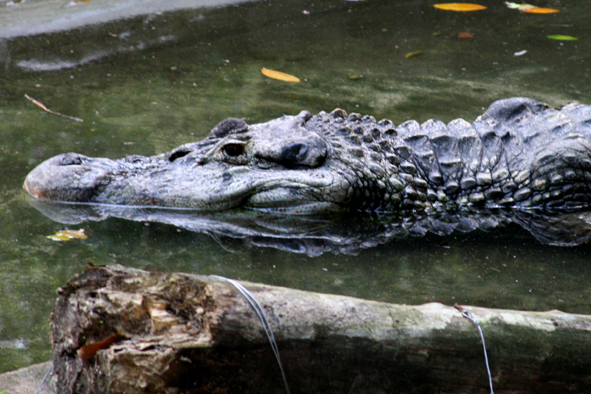
Black caiman (Melanosuchus niger)

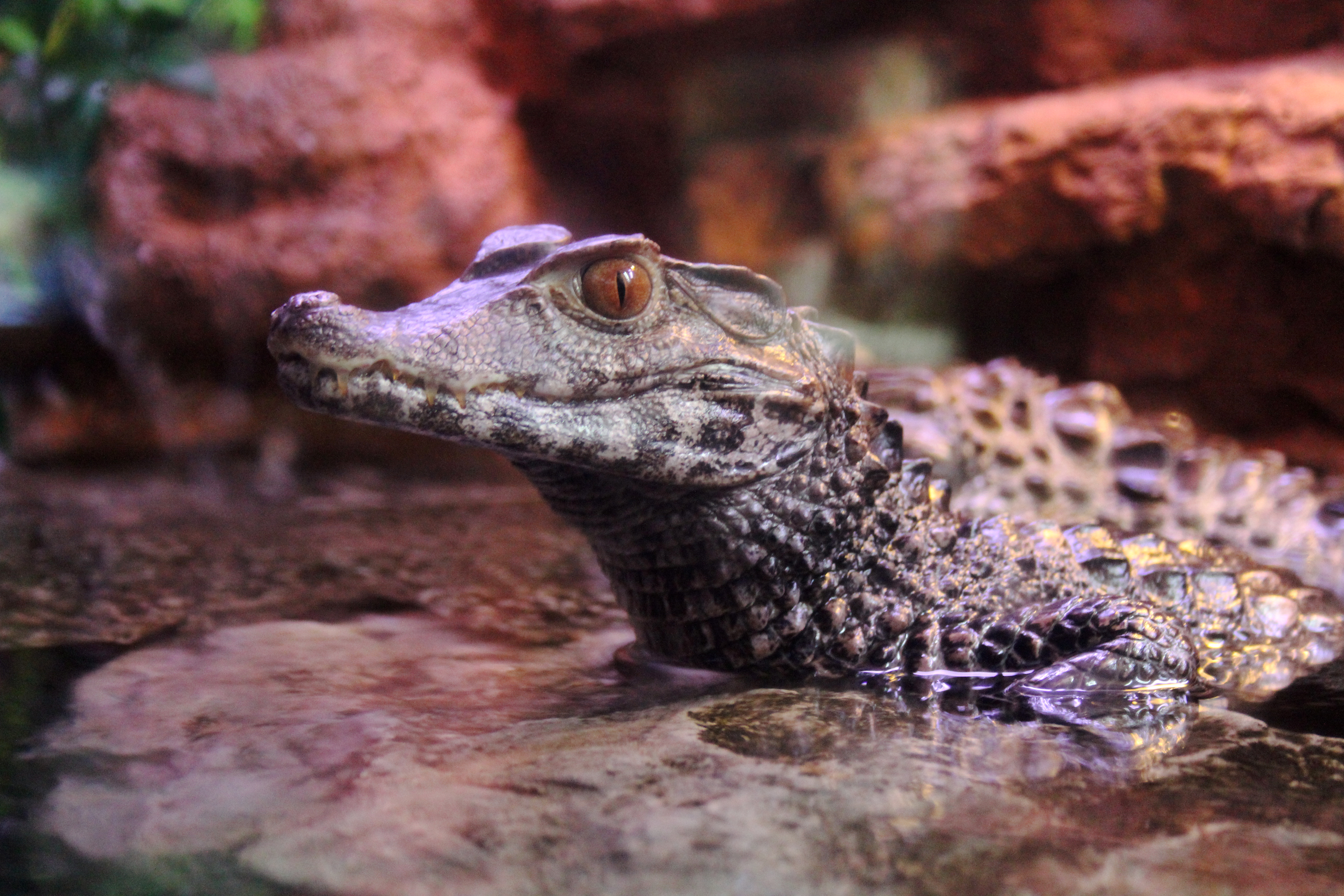
Cuvier's dwarf caiman (Paleosuchus palpebrosus)

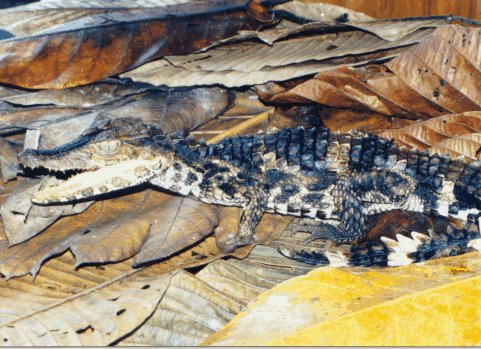
Smooth-fronted caiman (Paleosuchus trigonatus)

A caiman (/ˈkeɪmən/), also spelled cayman (from Taíno kaiman), is an alligatorid belonging to the subfamily Caimaninae, one of two primary lineages within the Alligatoridae family, the other being alligators. Caimans are native to Central and South America and inhabit marshes, swamps, lakes, and mangrove rivers. They have scaly skin and live a fairly nocturnal existence. They are relatively small-sized crocodilians with an average maximum weight of 6 to 40 kg (13 to 88 lb) depending on species, with the exception of the black caiman (Melanosuchus niger), which can grow more than 4 m (13 ft) long and weigh more than 450 kg (990 lb). The black caiman is the largest caiman species in the world and is found in the slow-moving rivers and lakes that surround the Amazon basin. The smallest species is the Cuvier's dwarf caiman (Paleosuchus palpebrosus), which grows to 1.2 to 1.5 m (3.9 to 4.9 ft) long. There are six different species of caiman found throughout the watery jungle habitats of Central and Southern America. The average length for most of the other caiman species is about 2 to 2.5 m (6.6 to 8.2 ft) long.

Caimans are distinguished from alligators, their closest relatives, by a few defining features: a lack of a bony septum between the nostrils, ventral armor composed of overlapping bony scutes formed from two parts united by a suture, and longer and sharper teeth than alligators. Caimans also tend to be more agile and crocodile-like in their movements. The calcium rivets on caiman scales make their hides stiffer than those of alligators.

Several extinct forms are known, including Purussaurus, a giant Miocene genus that grew to 7.6–10 m (25–33 ft) and the 5.89 m (19.3 ft) Mourasuchus, which had a wide duck-like snout.

== Behavior ==
Caimans are predators and, like alligators and crocodiles, their diet largely consists of fish. Caimans also hunt insects, birds, small mammals and reptiles.

Because of their large size and ferocious nature, caimans have few natural predators within their environments. Humans are their main predators, because the animals have been hunted for their meat and skin. Jaguars, anacondas and crocodiles are the only other predators of caimans, although they usually prey on the smaller specimens or specific species of caiman such as the Spectacled Caiman and Yacare caiman. During summer or droughts, caimans may dig a burrow and go into a form of summer hibernation called aestivation.

Female caimans build a large nest in which to lay their eggs. The nests can be more than 1.5 m (4.9 ft) wide. Female caimans lay between 10 and 50 eggs, which hatch within about six weeks. Once they have hatched, the mother caiman takes her young to a shallow pool of water, where they can learn how to hunt and swim. The juveniles of spectacled caiman have been shown to stay together in pods for up to 18 months.

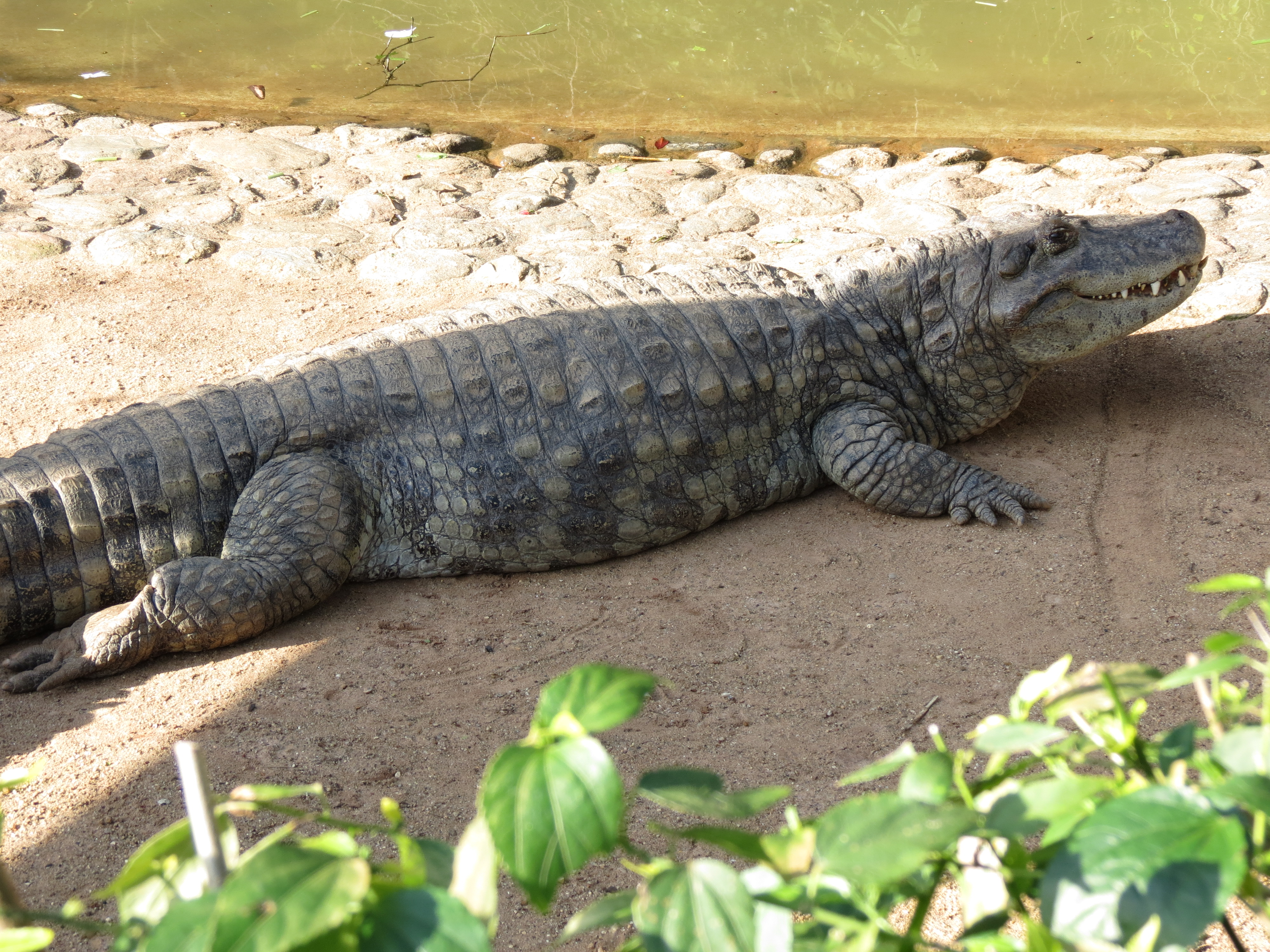
Broad-snouted caiman (Caiman latirostris)

== Phylogeny ==
Caimaninae is cladistically defined as Caiman crocodylus (the spectacled caiman) and all species closer to it than to Alligator mississippiensis (the American alligator). This is a stem-based definition for caimaninae, and means that it includes more basal extinct caimanine ancestors that are more closely related to living caimans than to alligators. The clade Jacarea includes the most derived caimans, being defined as the last common ancestor of Caiman latirostris (Broad-snouted caiman), Caiman crocodilus (Spectacled caiman), Caiman yacare (Yacare caiman), Melanosuchus niger (Black caiman), and all its descendants.

Below is a cladogram showing the phylogeny of Caimaninae, modified from Hastings et al. (2013).

- - †Stangerochampsa mccabei
  - - †Brachychampsa montana
    - †Brachychampsa sealeyi
  - Alligatoridae
    - Alligatorinae
    - Caimaninae
      - †Culebrasuchus mesoamericanus
      - - †Eocaiman cavernensis
        - - †Tsoabichi greenriverensis
          - crown group caimans
            - - Paleosuchus palpebrosus Cuvier's dwarf caiman
              - Paleosuchus trigonatus Smooth-fronted caiman
            - - - †Centenariosuchus gilmorei
                - - †Purussaurus neivensis
                  - - †Mourasuchus spp.
                    - †Orthogenysuchus olseni
              - - - Caiman crocodilus Spectacled caiman
                  - Caiman yacare Yacare caiman
                - - Caiman latirostris Broad-snouted caiman
                  - †Caiman lutescens
                  - - †Melanosuchus fisheri
                    - Melanosuchus niger Black caiman

Here is an alternative cladogram from Bona et al. 2018.

- Alligatoridae (crown group)
  - Alligatorinae (stem-based group)
  - Caimaninae (stem-based group)
    - - Stangerochampsa†
      - Albertochampsa†
      - Brachychampsa†
    - - Protocaiman†
      - - Gnatusuchus†
        - - Globidentosuchus†
          - - - Eocaiman†
              - Notocaiman†
            - - Kuttanacaiman†
              - - - Purussaurus†
                  - Mourasuchus†
                - crown group caimans
                  - - Necrosuchus†
                    - Tsoabichi†
                    - - Paleosuchus trigonatus Smooth-fronted caiman
                      - Paleosuchus palpebrosus Cuvier's dwarf caiman
                  - - Centenariosuchus†
                    - - - Caiman latirostris Broad-snouted caiman
                        - Melanosuchus niger Black caiman
                      - - - Caiman yacare Yacare caiman
                          - Caiman crocodilus Spectacled caiman
                        - - Caiman brevirostris†
                          - - La Venta Caiman†
                            - Caiman wannlangstoni†

The Late Cretaceous taxa Stangerochampsa, Brachychampsa and Albertochampsa have been previously referred to as stem-group caimans, but Walter et al. (2022) recovered them as the basalmost alligatorines based on phylogenetic analysis and claimed that the earliest definitive stem-group caimans are known from the earliest Paleocene. A different study by Adam Cossette and David Tarailo in 2024 recovered Brachychampsa and relatives in a clade at the base of Caimaninae. They named this clade Brachychampsini, defining it as "the largest clade of alligatorids more closely related to Brachychampsa montana than to Caiman crocodilus or Alligator mississippiensis".

== See also ==
- Chinese alligator
