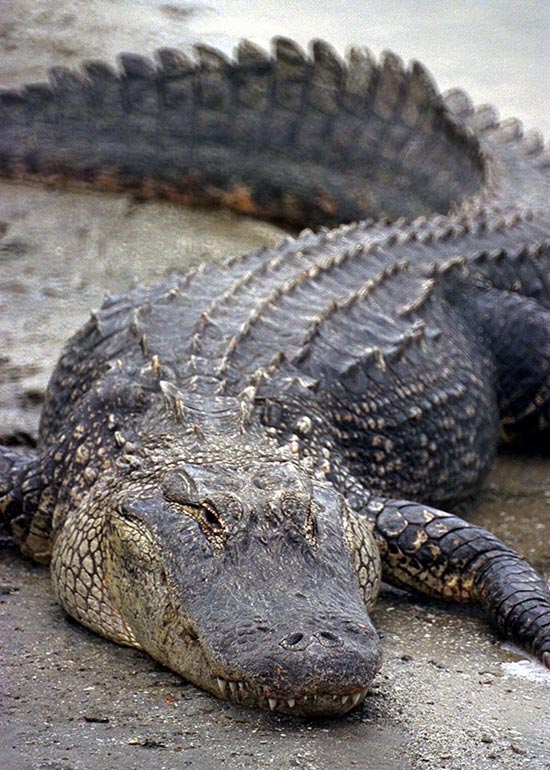
- American alligator (Alligator mississippiensis)

Scientific classification
- Kingdom: Animalia
- Phylum: Chordata
- Class: Reptilia
- Order: Crocodylia
- Clade: Globidonta
- Family: Alligatoridae; Gray, 1844

Subfamilies
- Alligatorinae; Caimaninae

= Alligatoridae =

Alligatoridae Temporal range: Campanian–Present

Family of crocodilians including alligators and caimans

The family Alligatoridae of crocodilians includes alligators, caimans and their extinct relatives.

== Phylogeny ==
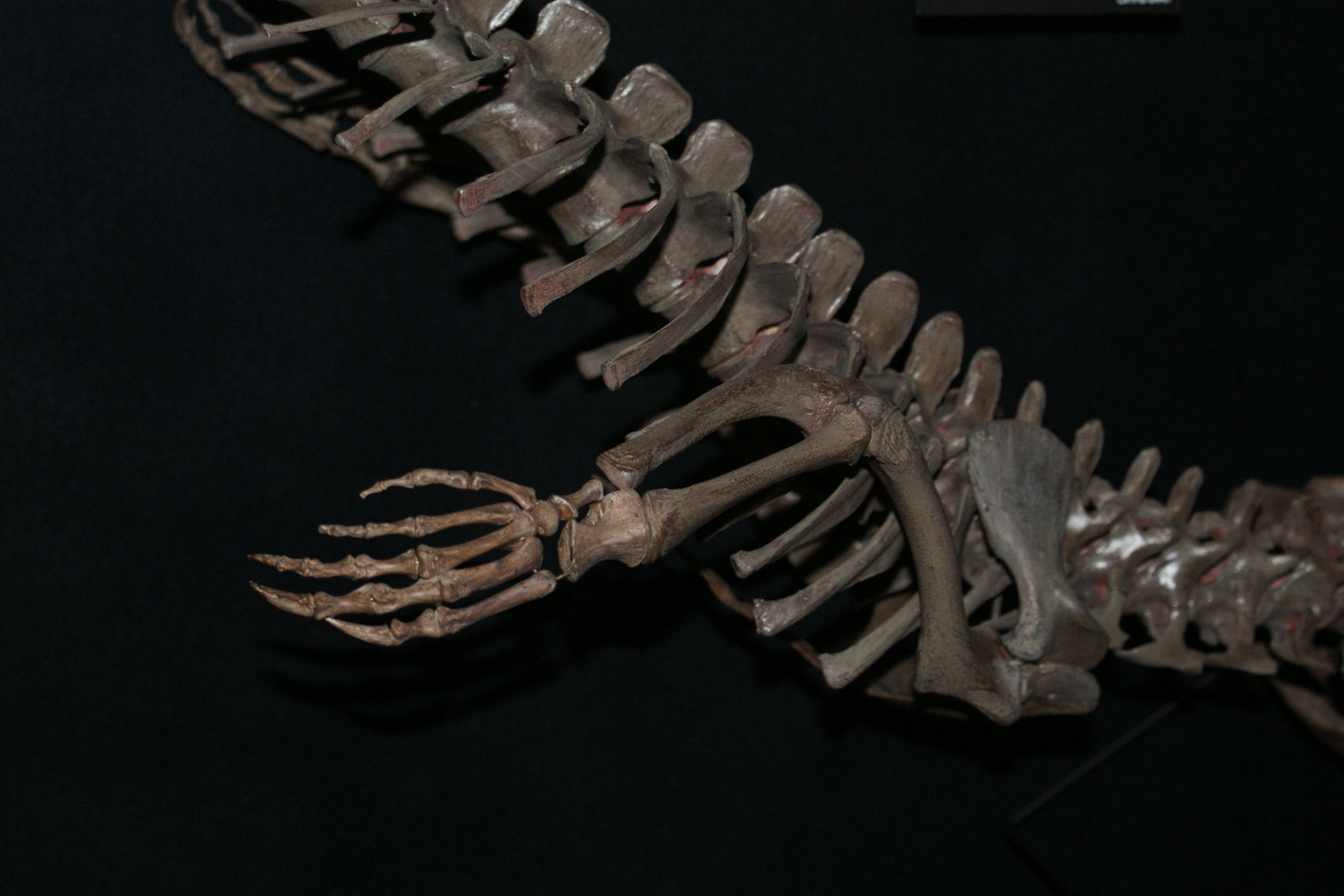
A. olseni fore limb

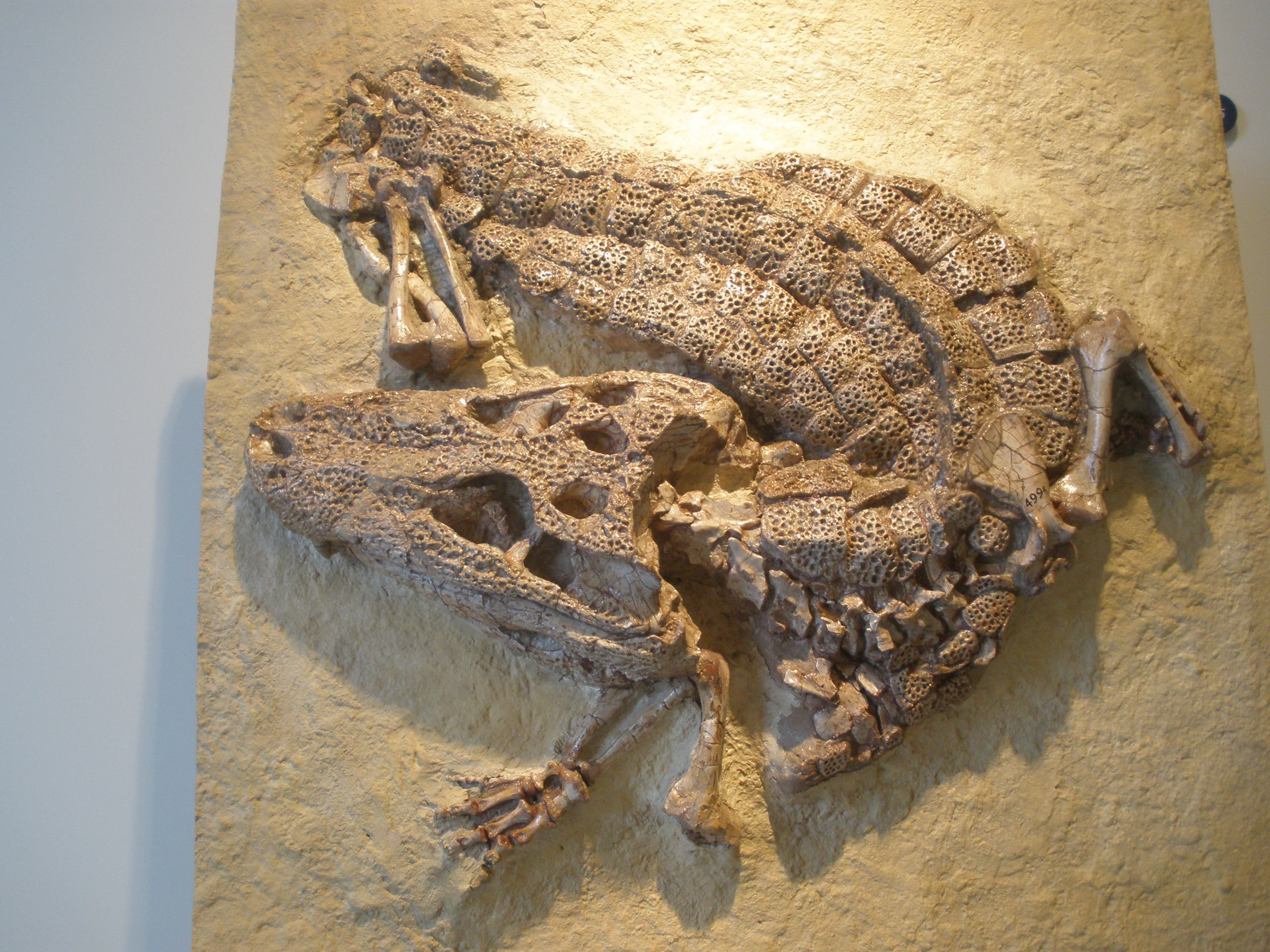
Alligator prenasalis fossil

The superfamily Alligatoroidea includes all crocodilians (fossil and extant) that are more closely related to the American alligator than to either the Nile crocodile or the gharial. This is a stem-based definition for alligators, and is more inclusive than the crown group Alligatoridae. As a crown group, Alligatoridae only includes the last common ancestor of all extant (living) alligators, caimans, and their descendants (living or extinct), whereas Alligatoroidea, as a stem-based group, also includes more basal extinct alligator ancestors that are more closely related to living alligators than to crocodiles or gavialids. When considering only living taxa (neontology), Alligatoroidea and Alligatoridae contain the same species.

The simplified cladogram below shows Alligatoridae's relationships to other extant (living) crocodilians.

- Crocodylia (crown group)
  - Alligatoroidea (stem-based group)
    - Leidyosuchus†
    - - Diplocynodontinae†
        Diplocynodon†
      - Globidonta (stem-based group)
        - extinct basal Alligatoroid Globidontans†
        - Alligatoridae (crown group)
          - Caimaninae (stem-based group)
            - - Caiman
              - Melanosuchus
            - Paleosuchus
          - Alligatorinae (stem-based group)
            Alligator
  - - extinct basal Crocodilians† (possibly including Mekosuchinae†)
    - Longirostres (crown group)
      - Crocodyloidea (stem-based group)
        - extinct basal crocodiles†
        - Crocodylidae (crown group)
      - Gavialoidea (stem-based group)
        - extinct basal Gavialoids†
        - Gavialidae (crown group)
          - Gavialis
          - Tomistoma

Alligatoridae contains eight living species: two alligators within Alligatorinae, and the six caimans of Caimaninae. Phylogenetic studies using molecular DNA consistently resolve their relationships as follows:

- Alligatoridae
  - Caimaninae
    - - Paleosuchus palpebrosus Cuvier's dwarf caiman
      - Paleosuchus trigonatus Smooth-fronted caiman
    - Jacarea
      - - - Caiman crocodilus Spectacled caiman
          - Caiman yacare Yacare caiman
        - Caiman latirostris Broad-snouted caiman
      - Melanosuchus niger Black caiman
  - Alligatorinae
    - Alligator sinensis Chinese alligator
    - Alligator mississippiensis American alligator

The below detailed cladogram shows one proposal for the internal relationships within Alligatoridae including fossil species, based on morphological analysis (although the exact alligatoroid phylogeny is still disputed).

- Alligatoroidea (stem-based group)
  - Leidyosuchus†
  - - Diplocynodon†
    - Alligatoridae (crown group)
      - Alligatorinae (stem-based group)
        - Ceratosuchus†
        - Allognathosuchus†
        - Navajosuchus†
        - Arambourgia†
        - Procaimanoidea†
        - - Wannaganosuchus†
          - - Alligator prenasalis†
            - - Alligator mcgrewi†
              - - Alligator olseni†
                - - Alligator sinensis Chinese alligator
                  - - Culebrasuchus†
                    - - Alligator mississippiensis American alligator
                      - Alligator mefferdi†
                      - Alligator thomsoni†
      - Caimaninae (stem-based group)
        - - Stangerochampsa†
          - Albertochampsa†
          - Brachychampsa†
        - - Protocaiman†
          - - Gnatusuchus†
            - - Globidentosuchus†
              - - - Eocaiman†
                  - Notocaiman†
                - - Kuttanacaiman†
                  - - - Purussaurus†
                      - Mourasuchus†
                    - - - Necrosuchus†
                        - Tsoabichi†
                        - - Paleosuchus trigonatus Smooth-fronted caiman
                          - Paleosuchus palpebrosus Cuvier's dwarf caiman
                      - - Centenariosuchus†
                        - - - Caiman latirostris Broad-snouted caiman
                            - Melanosuchus niger Black caiman
                          - - - Caiman yacare Yacare caiman
                              - Caiman crocodilus Spectacled caiman
                            - - Caiman brevirostris†
                              - - La Venta Caiman†
                                - Caiman wannlangstoni†

== Evolution ==
The superfamily Alligatoroidea is thought to have split from the crocodile-gharial lineage in the late Cretaceous, about 87 million years ago. Leidyosuchus of Alberta is among the earliest known genera. Fossil alligatoroids have been found throughout Eurasia as land bridges across both the North Atlantic and the Bering Strait have connected North America to Eurasia during the Cretaceous, Paleogene, and Neogene periods. Alligators and caimans split in North America during the early Tertiary or late Cretaceous (about 53 million to about 65 million years ago) and the latter reached South America by the Paleogene, before the closure of the Isthmus of Panama during the Neogene period. The Chinese alligator split from the American alligator about 33 million years ago and likely descended from a lineage that crossed the Bering land bridge during the Neogene. The modern American alligator is well represented in the fossil record of the Pleistocene. The alligator's full mitochondrial genome was sequenced in the 1990s. The full genome, published in 2014, suggests that the alligator evolved much more slowly than mammals and birds.

== True alligators ==
The lineage including alligators proper (Alligatorinae) occurs in the fluvial deposits of the age of the Upper Chalk in Europe, where they died out in the Pliocene age. The true alligators are today represented by two species, A. mississippiensis in the southeastern United States which can grow to 15.6 feet (4.8 m) and weigh 1,000 pounds (450 kg), with unverified sizes of up to 19.2 feet (5.9 m), and the small A. sinensis in the Yangtze River, China, which grows to an average of 5 feet (1.5 m). Their name derives from the Spanish el lagarto, which means "the lizard".

== Caimans ==
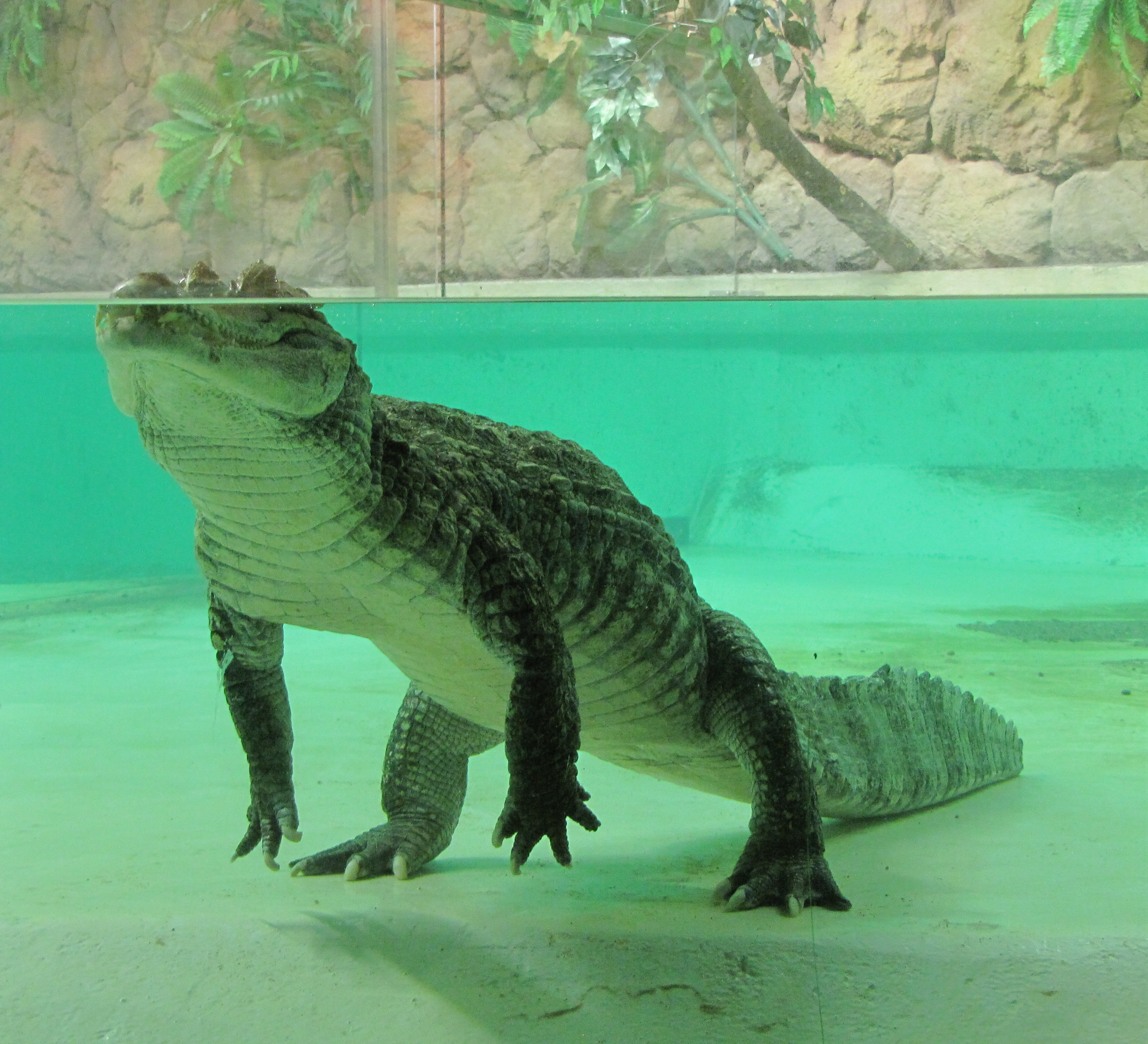
C. crocodilus at the Helsinki Tropicario Zoo aquarium in Helsinki, Finland in 2010

In Central and South America, the alligator family is represented by six species of the subfamily Caimaninae, which differ from the alligator by the absence of a bony septum between the nostrils, and having ventral armour composed of overlapping bony scutes, each of which is formed of two parts united by a suture. Besides the three species in Caiman, the smooth-fronted caimans in genus Paleosuchus and the black caiman in Melanosuchus are described. Caimans tend to be more agile and crocodile-like in their movements, and have longer, sharper teeth than alligators.

C. crocodilus, the spectacled caiman, has the widest distribution, from southern Mexico to the northern half of Argentina, and grows to a modest size of about 2.2 m (7.2 ft). The largest is the near-threatened Melanosuchus niger, the jacaré-açu or large or black caiman of the Amazon River basin. Black caimans grow to 4.4 m (14.5 ft), with the unverified size of up to 5.7 m (19 ft). The black caiman and American alligator are the only members of the alligator family that pose the same danger to humans as the larger species of the crocodile family.

Although caimans have not been studied in depth, scientists have learned their mating cycles (previously thought to be spontaneous or year-round) are linked to the rainfall cycles and the river levels, which increases chances of survival for their offspring.

== Taxonomy ==
† = extinct

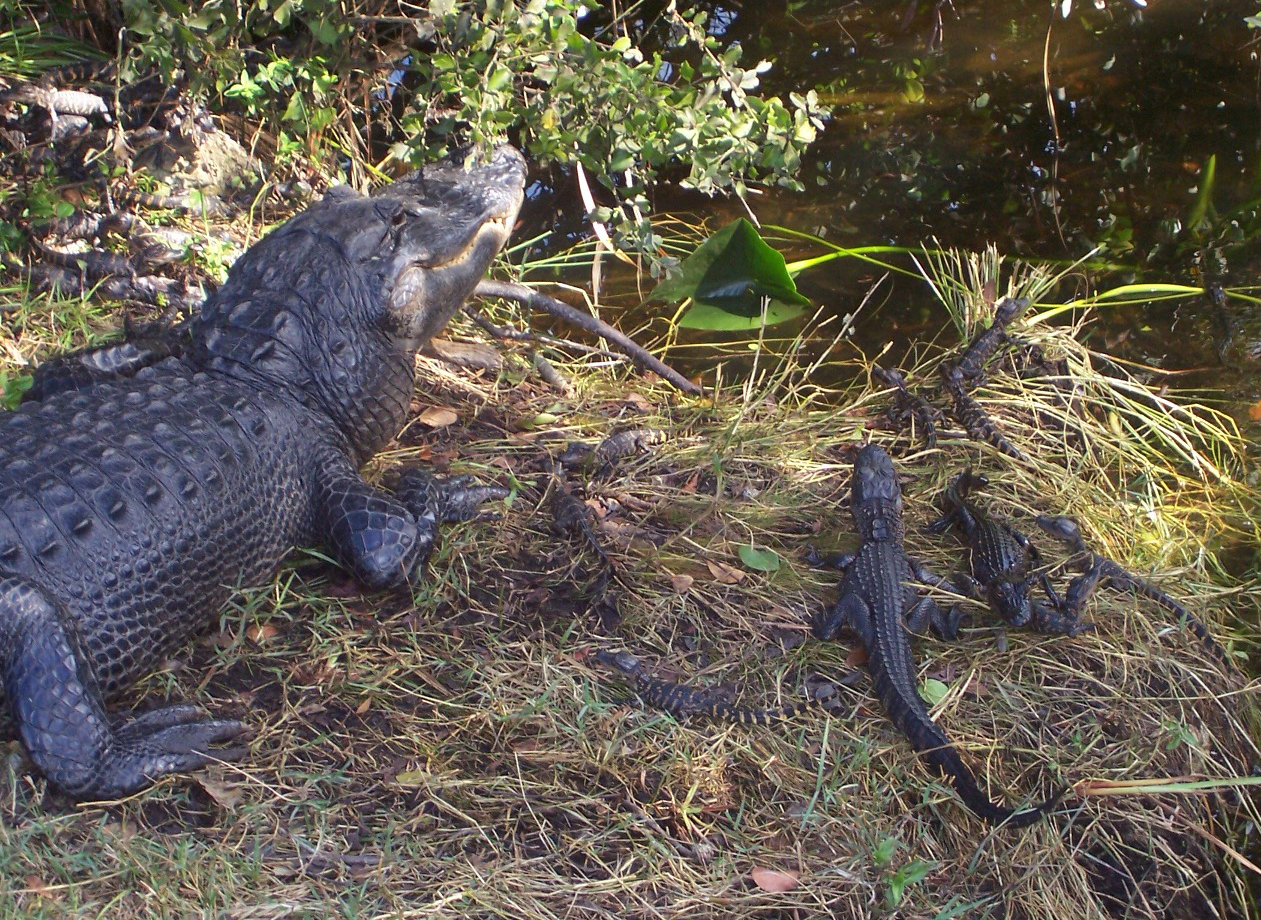
An alligator nest at Everglades National Park, Florida, United States

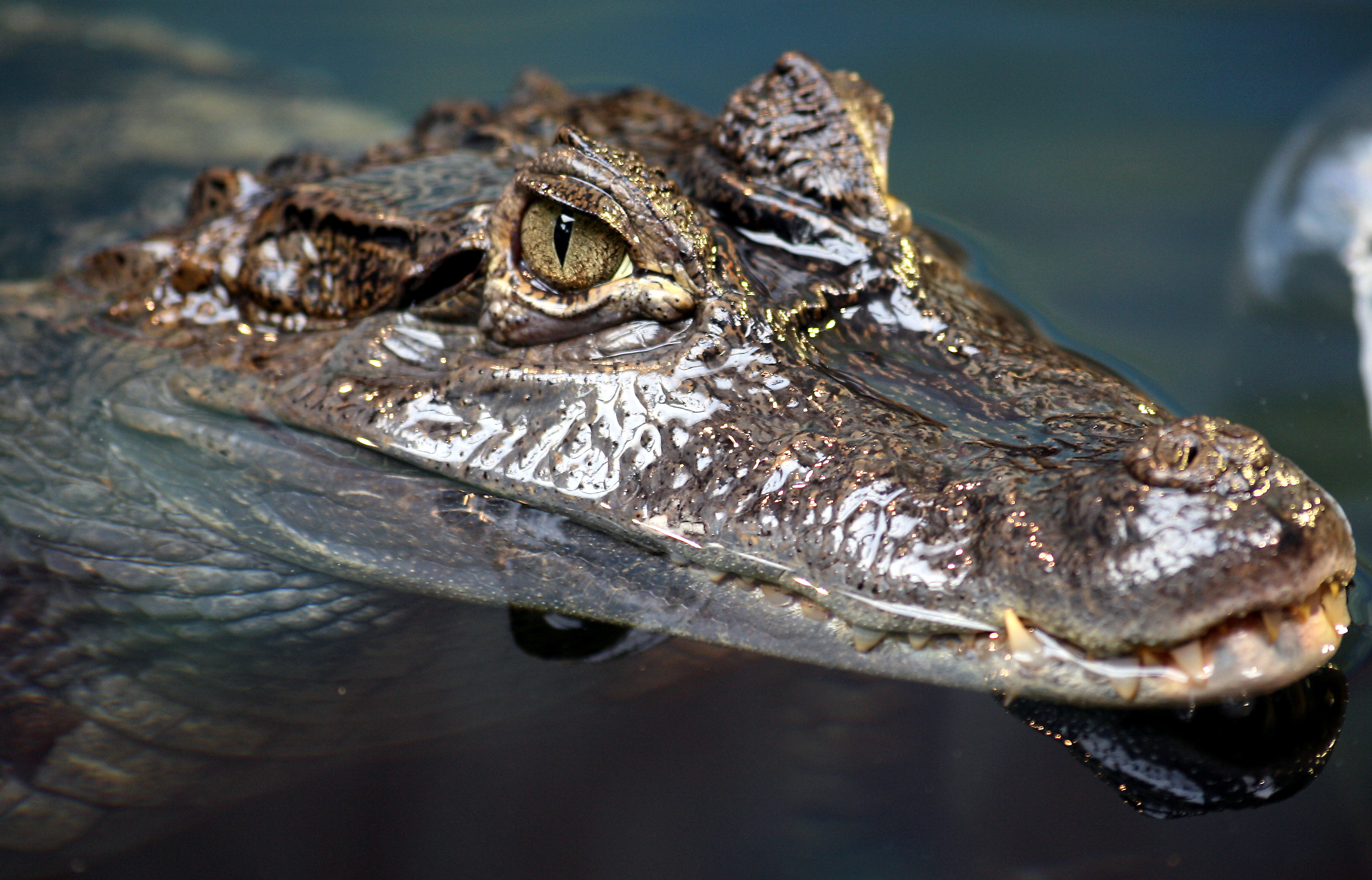
Spectacled caiman head

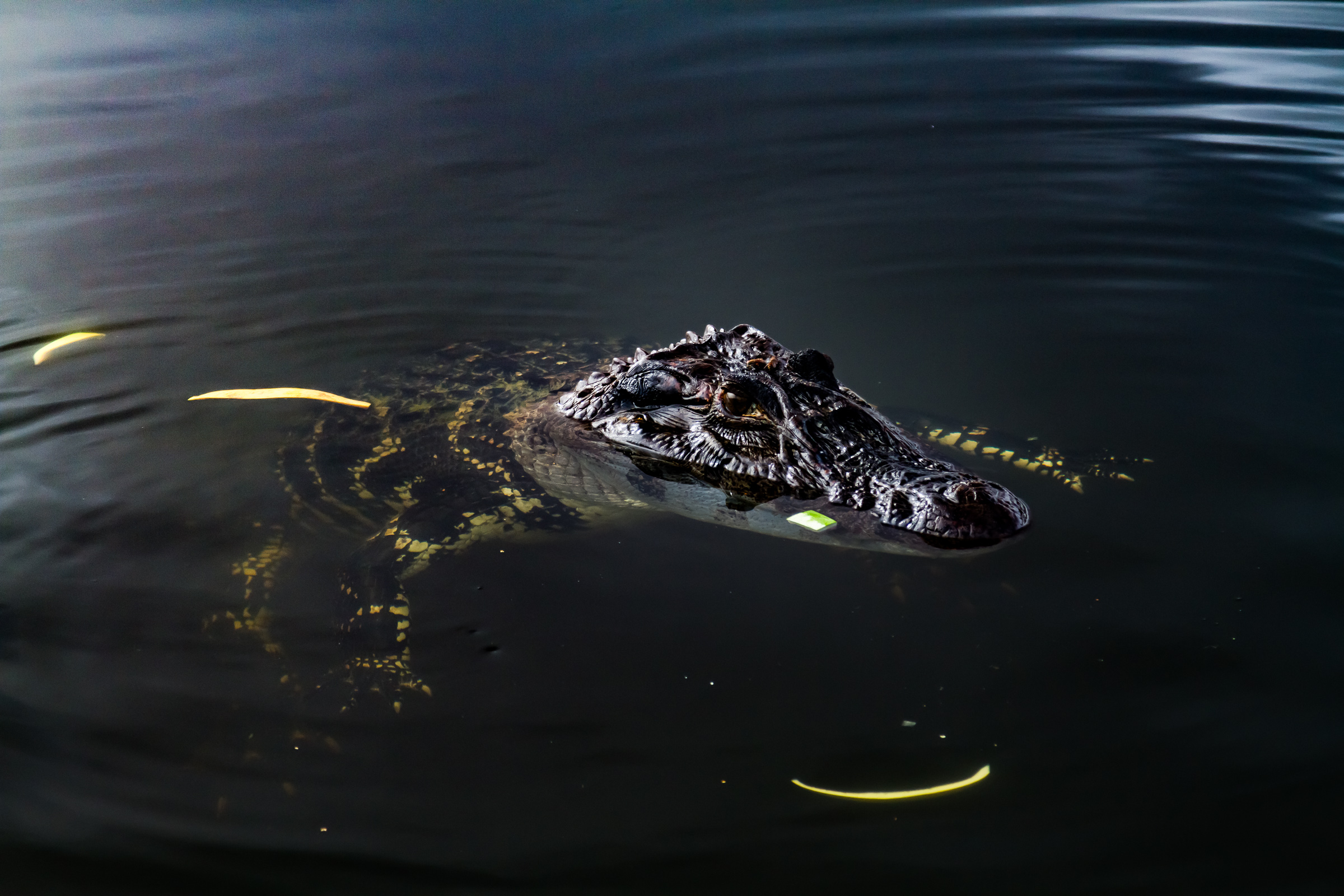
Black caiman, Jauaperi River, Amazonia

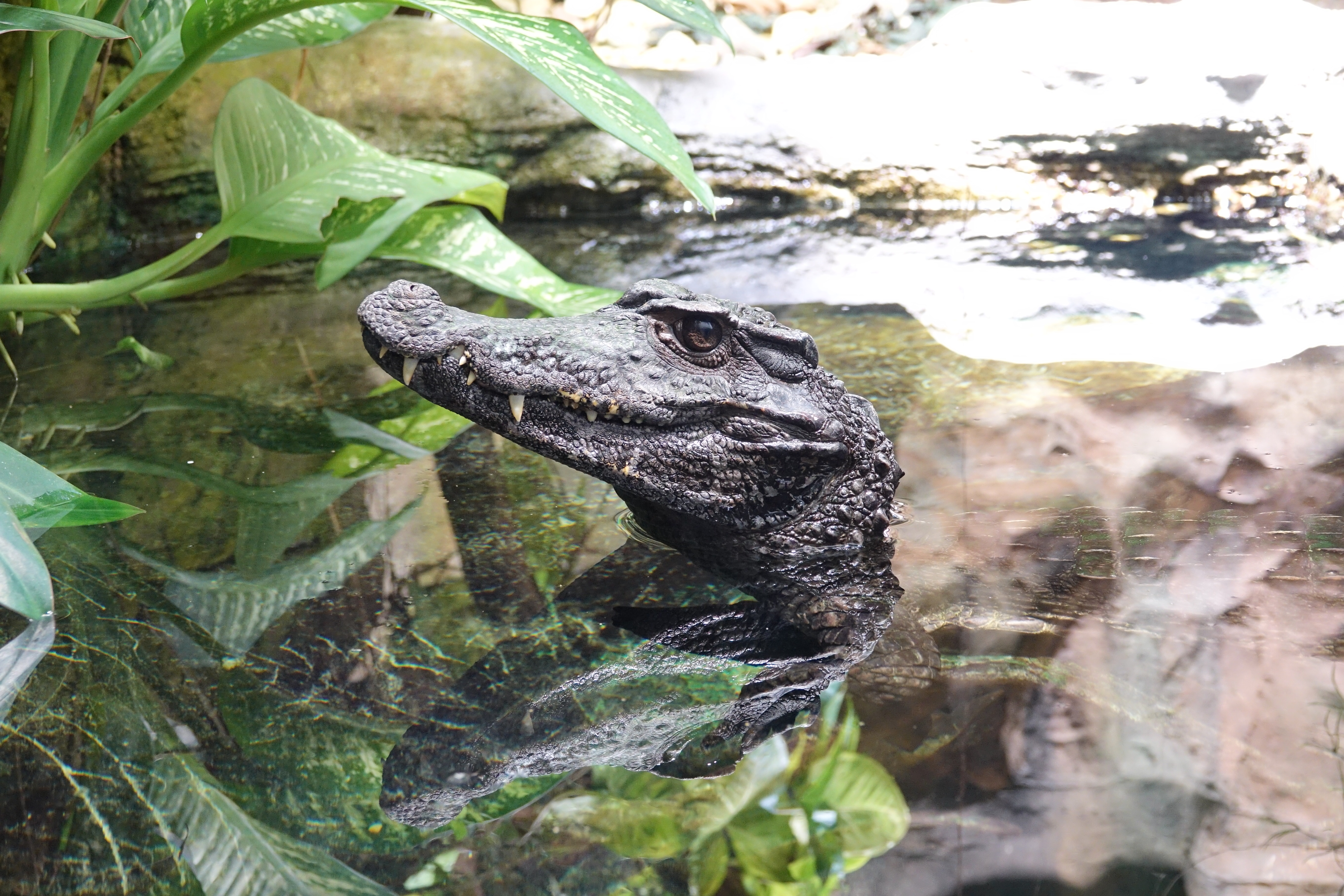
Head of smooth-fronted caiman

- Family Alligatoridae
  - Subfamily Alligatorinae
    - Genus Alligator
      - † Alligator hailensis
      - † Alligator mcgrewi
      - † Alligator mefferdi
      - Alligator mississippiensis, American alligator
      - † Alligator olseni
      - † Alligator prenasalis
      - Alligator sinensis, Chinese alligator
      - † Alligator munensis
      - † Alligator thomsoni
    - Genus † Allognathosuchus
    - Genus † Arambourgia
    - Genus † Ceratosuchus
    - Genus † Chrysochampsa
    - Genus † Eoalligator
    - Genus † Hassiacosuchus
    - Genus † Krabisuchus
    - Genus † Navajosuchus?
    - Genus † Procaimanoidea
    - Genus † Wannaganosuchus
  - Subfamily Caimaninae
    - Genus † Acresuchus
    - Genus † Bottosaurus
    - Genus Caiman
      - † Caiman brevirostris
      - Caiman crocodilus, Spectacled caiman
      - Caiman latirostris, Broad-snouted caiman
      - † Caiman lutescans
      - † Caiman venezuelensis
      - † Caiman wannlangstoni
      - Caiman yacare, Yacare caiman
    - Genus † Centenariosuchus
    - Genus † Chinatichampsus
    - Genus † Culebrasuchus
    - Genus † Eocaiman
    - Genus † Globidentosuchus
    - Genus † Gnatusuchus
    - Genus † Kuttanacaiman
    - Genus Melanosuchus
      - † Melanosuchus fisheri
      - Melanosuchus niger, Black caiman
    - Genus † Mourasuchus
    - Genus † Necrosuchus
    - Genus † Orthogenysuchus
    - Genus Paleosuchus
      - Paleosuchus palpebrosus, Cuvier's dwarf caiman
      - Paleosuchus trigonatus, Smooth-fronted caiman
    - Genus † Protocaiman
    - Genus † Purussaurus
    - Genus † Tsoabichi
