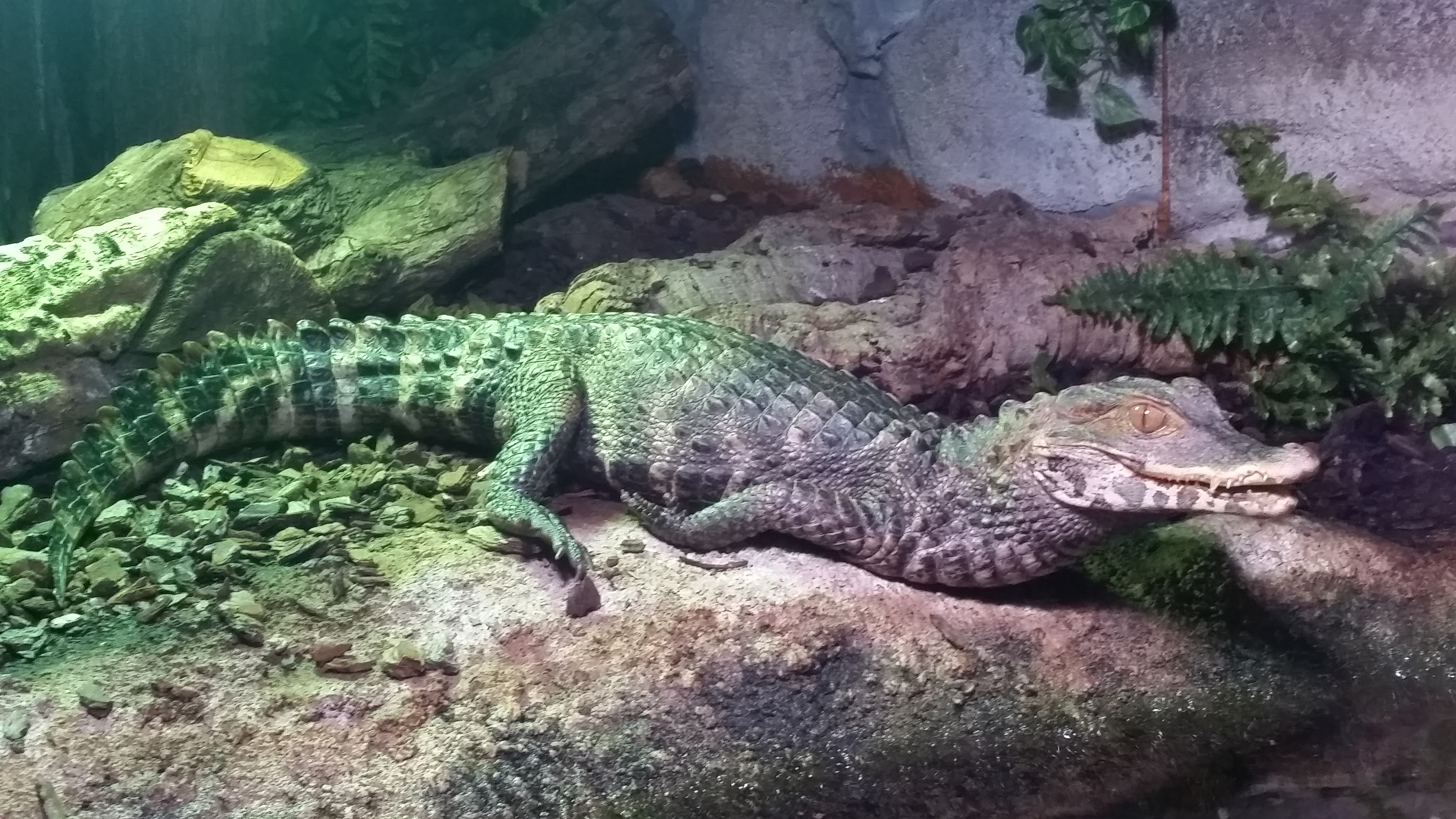

Conservation status
- Least Concern (IUCN 3.1)
- CITES Appendix II

Scientific classification
- Kingdom: Animalia
- Phylum: Chordata
- Class: Reptilia
- Order: Crocodilia
- Family: Alligatoridae
- Subfamily: Caimaninae
- Genus: Paleosuchus
- Species: P. palpebrosus

Binomial name
- Paleosuchus palpebrosus Cuvier, 1807
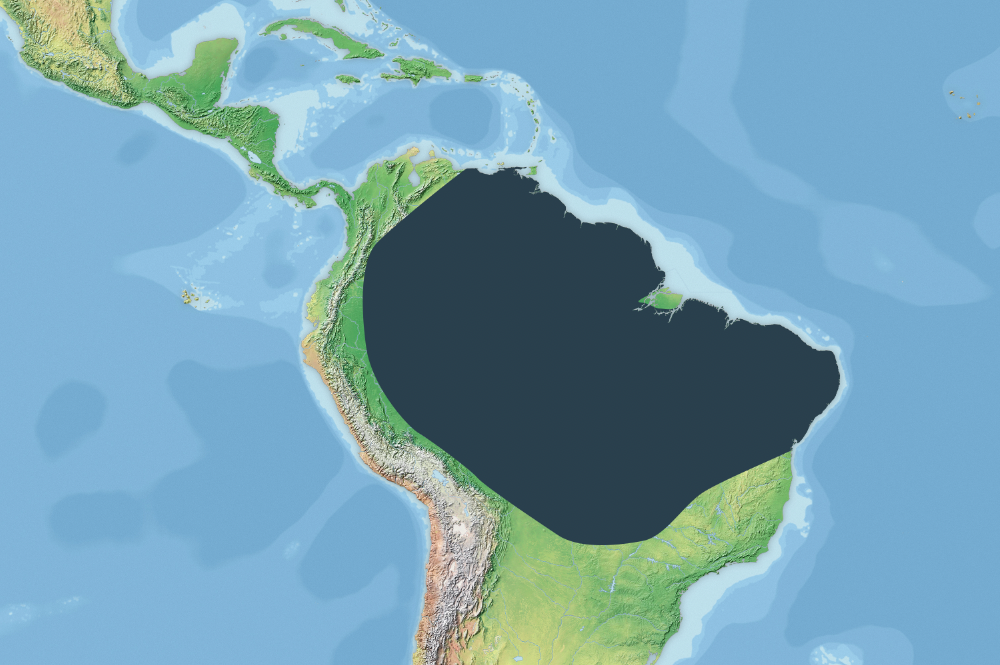
- Range in black

Synonyms
- List: Crocodilus palpebrosus (Cuvier, 1807); Jacaretinga moschifer Spix, 1825; Champsa gibbiceps Natterer, 1841; Champsa palpebrosus Wagler, 1830; Alligator palpebrosus Duméril & Bibron, 1836; Paleosuchus palpebrosus King & Burke, 1989; Paleosuchus palpebrosus Gorzula & Senaris, 1999

= Cuvier's dwarf caiman =

Cuvier's dwarf caiman Temporal range: Late Pleistocene - Recent, 0.1–0 Ma

Species of reptile

Cuvier's dwarf caiman (Paleosuchus palpebrosus) is a small crocodilian in the alligator family from northern and central South America. It is found in Bolivia, Brazil, Colombia, Ecuador, French Guiana, Guyana, Paraguay, Peru, Suriname, Trinidad and Venezuela. It lives in riverine forests, flooded forests near lakes, and near fast-flowing rivers and streams. It can traverse dry land to reach temporary pools and tolerates colder water than other species of caimans. Other common names for this species include the musky caiman, the dwarf caiman, Cuvier's caiman, and the smooth-fronted caiman (the latter name is also used for P. trigonatus). It is sometimes kept in captivity as a pet and may be referred to as the wedge-head caiman by the pet trade community.

Cuvier's dwarf caiman was first described by the French zoologist Georges Cuvier in 1807 and is one of only two species in the genus Paleosuchus, the other species being P. trigonatus. Their closest relatives are the other caimans in the subfamily Caimaninae. With a total length averaging 1.4 m (4.6 ft) for males and up to 1.2 m (3.9 ft) for females, Cuvier's dwarf caiman is not only the smallest extant species in the alligator and caiman family, but also the smallest of all crocodilians (unless the Congo dwarf crocodile is considered a valid species). An adult weighs around 5 to 7 kg (11 to 15 lb). Its lack of size is partly made up for by its strong body armor, provided by the bony bases to its dermal scales, which provides protection against predators. Juvenile dwarf caimans mainly feed on invertebrates, but also small fish and frogs, while adults eat larger fish, amphibians, and invertebrates, such as large molluscs. This caiman sometimes uses a burrow as shelter during the day and in the Pantanal may aestivate in the burrow to stay cool in the dry season. The female buries her eggs on a mounded nest and these take about 3 months to hatch. She helps the hatchlings to escape from the nest and provides some parental care for the first few weeks of their lives. This caiman has a wide range and large total population, and the IUCN lists its conservation status as being of least concern.

== Etymology ==
The genus name Paleosuchus is derived from the Greek palaios meaning "ancient" and soukhos meaning "crocodile". This refers to the belief that this crocodile comes from an ancient lineage that diverged from other species of caimans some 30 million years ago. The specific name palpebrosus is derived from the Latin palpebra meaning "eyelid" and osus meaning "full of". This refers to the bony plates (palpebrals) present on the upper eyelids.

Common names include the musky caiman, the dwarf caiman, Cuvier's caiman, and the smooth-fronted caiman, although the last of these is also used to refer to the closely related P. trigonatus. In the pet trade, it is sometimes referred to as the wedge-head caiman.

== Discovery and taxonomy ==
Cuvier's dwarf caiman was first described by Cuvier in 1807 as Crocodylus palpebrosus from a type locality described as "Cayenne". Since then, it has been given a number of names by different authorities: Crocodilus (Alligator) palpebrosus (Merrem, 1820), Jacaretinga moschifer (Spix, 1825), Champsa palpebrosa (Wagler, 1830), Alligator palpebrosus (Dumeril and Bibron, 1836), Champsa gibbiceps (Natterer, 1841), Caiman palpebrosus (Gray, 1844), Caiman (Aromosuchus) palpebrosus (Gray, 1862), and Jacaretinga palpebrosus (Vaillant, 1898). Muller, in 1924, and Schmidt, in 1928, were the first to use the currently accepted name of Paleosuchus palpebrosus. No subspecies are recognised.

At present, the genus Paleosuchus contains only two members, Paleosuchus trigonatus, commonly known as the smooth-fronted or Schneider's dwarf caiman, and P. palpebrosus, both from South America. Paleosuchus is distinguished from other caimans in the alligator subfamily Caimaninae by the absence of an interorbital ridge and the presence of four teeth in the premaxilla region of the jaw, where other species of caimans have five. The relationships of extant (living) caimans can be shown in the cladogram below, based on molecular DNA-based phylogenetic studies:

- Alligatoridae
  - Caimaninae
    - - Paleosuchus palpebrosus Cuvier's dwarf caiman
      - Paleosuchus trigonatus Schneider's dwarf caiman
    - Jacarea
      - - - Caiman crocodilus Spectacled caiman
          - Caiman yacare Yacare caiman
        - Caiman latirostris Broad-snouted caiman
      - Melanosuchus niger Black caiman
  - Alligatorinae
    - Alligator sinensis Chinese alligator
    - Alligator mississippiensis American alligator

A genetic study in 2012 found clear differences between various populations of Cuvier's dwarf caiman (Pantanal; Madeira River basin; Rio Negro basin), and these are apparently isolated from each other, leading to the suggestion that it may be a cryptic species complex.

== Description ==
Cuvier's dwarf caiman is the smallest living New World crocodilian. Males grow to a maximum length around 1.6 m (5.2 ft) while females do not usually exceed 1.2 m (3 ft 11 in). The largest specimen on record measured 1.73 m (5.7 ft) in length. This may be an underestimate of the animal's maximum size, as nearly all large adults have lost the tips of their tails and the largest specimen measured in the Pantanal region had a snout–vent length of 1.125 m (4 ft) (equivalent to a total length of 2.1 m (6.9 ft) with an intact tail). An adult typically weighs around 6 or 7 kg (13 or 15 lb), around the same weight as a 6- to 12-month-old specimen of several larger species of crocodilians. Large adults of this species can weigh up to 37 kg (82 lb). Cuvier's dwarf caiman has strong body armor on both its dorsal (upper) and ventral (lower) sides, which may compensate for its small body size in reducing predation. The dermal scales providing this protection have a bony base and are known as osteoderms.

The head has an unusual shape for a crocodilian, with a dome-shaped skull and a short, smooth, concave snout with an upturned tip, the shape rather resembling the head of a dog. The upper jaw extends markedly further forward than the lower jaw. Four premaxillary and 14 to 15 maxillary teeth are on either side of the upper jaw and 21 or 22 teeth on each side of the lower jaw, giving a total of about 80 teeth. The neck is relatively slender and the dorsal scutes are less prominent than in the smooth-fronted caiman. The double rows of scutes on the tail are small and project vertically. Adults are dark brownish-black with a dark brown head, while juveniles are brown with black bands. The irises of the eyes are chestnut brown at all ages and the pupils are vertical slits.

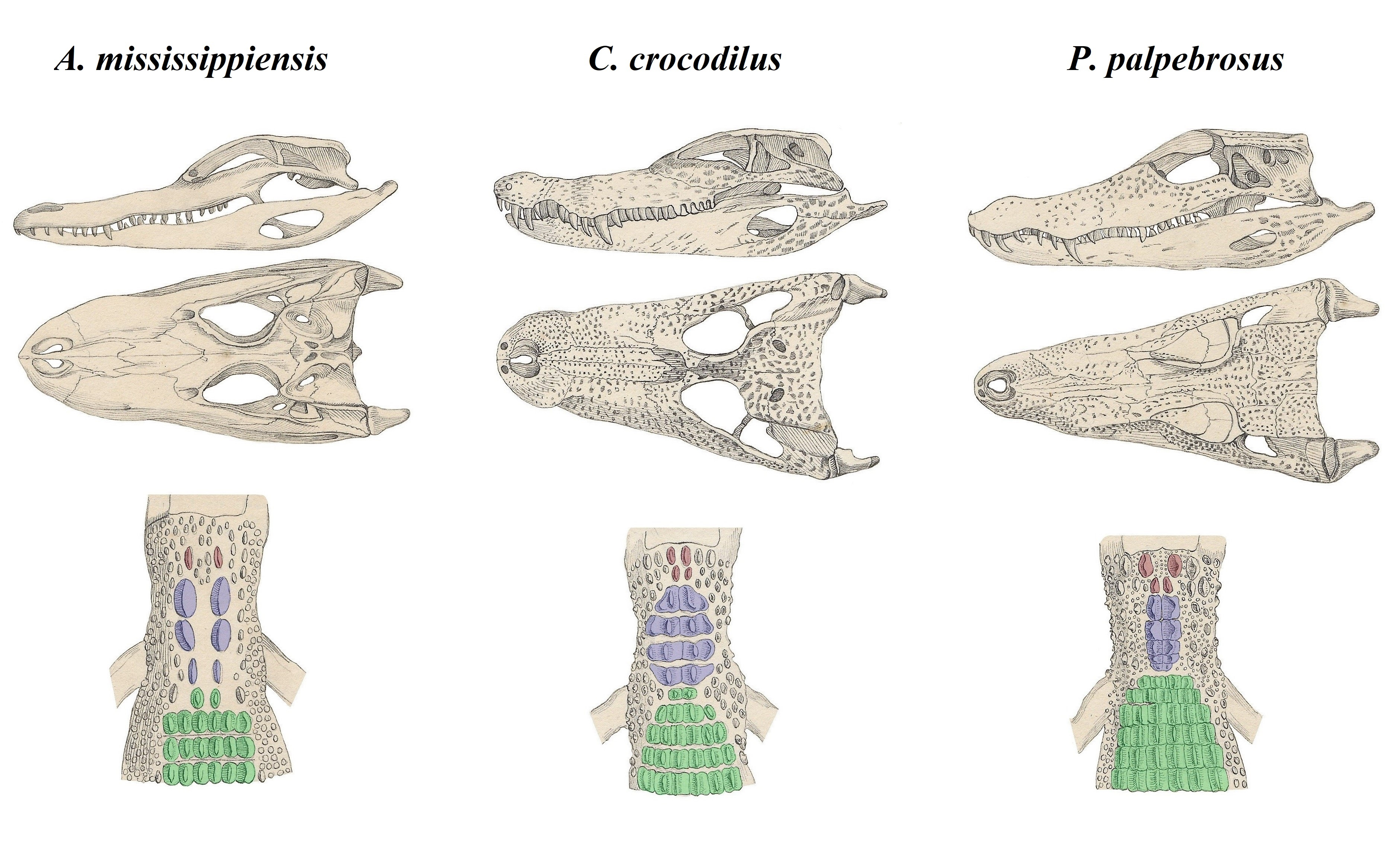
Skull and scutes, compared to American alligator (left) and spectacled caiman (middle).

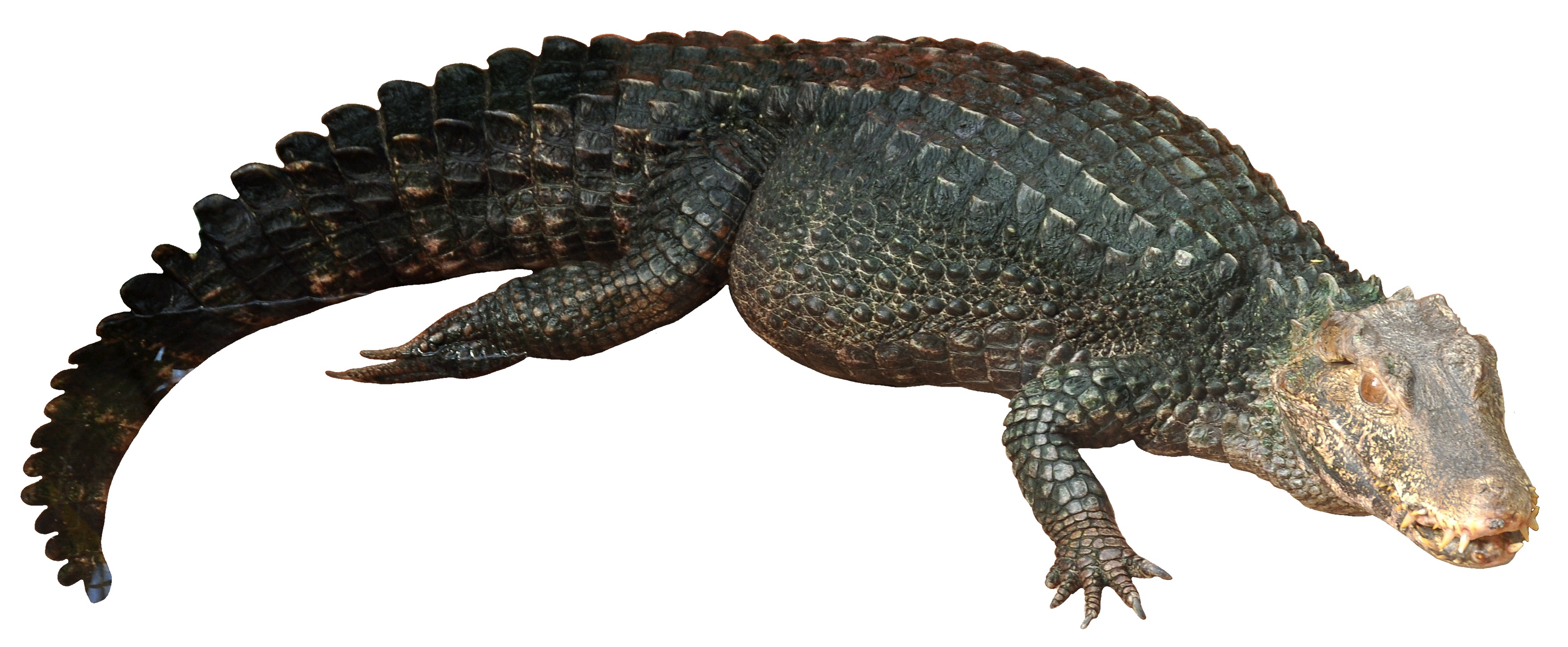
Scale arrangement is useful for identifying Cuvier's dwarf caiman.

The scutellation (arrangement of the scales) helps to distinguish Cuvier's dwarf caiman from Schneider's dwarf caiman.

Scutellation trait	Cuvier's dwarf caiman	Schneider's dwarf caiman
Post occipitals	Usually 2 rows	Usually 1 row
Nuchals	Usually 4–5 rows	Usually 4 rows, sometimes 5
Dorsals	18 longitudinal rows and 6–10 transverse rows, neatly arranged, with 4 rows between hind legs	18 longitudinal and 6–7 transverse rows, haphazardly arranged, with usually 2 rows between hind legs
Ventrals	21–22 longitudinal rows and 16 transverse	19–21 longitudinal and 10–12 transverse rows
Tail – single crest	Usually 19–21 scales	Usually 17–19 scales
Tail – double crest	Usually 9 or 10 rows	Usually 9 or 10 rows
Tail – lateral	Small scales disrupt 2–3 rows	5–8 rows

== Distribution and habitat ==
Cuvier's dwarf caiman is native to tropical northern and central South America. It is present in the drainages of the Orinoco River, the São Francisco River, and the Amazon River, and the upper reaches of the Paraná River and the Paraguay River. The countries in which it is found include Peru, Ecuador, Colombia, Venezuela, Guyana, Suriname, French Guiana, Brazil, Bolivia, Trinidad and Paraguay. The range of this species is rather larger than that of the sympatric smooth-fronted caiman, as it extends into Paraguay and includes a larger area of Brazil. They also follow seasonal fluctuations in water-level, while the smooth-fronted caiman does not, which may explain how the two species are able to live in sympatry.

Cuvier's dwarf caiman is a freshwater species and is found in forested riverine habitats and areas of flooded forest around lakes. It seems to prefer rivers and streams with fast-flowing water, but it is also found in quiet, nutrient-poor waters in Venezuela and southeastern Brazil. It is able to travel quite large distances overland at night and subadult individuals have sometimes been found in isolated, temporary pools. In the northern and southern parts of its range, it is also found in gallery forests in savanna country, but it is absent from such habitats in the Llanos and the Pantanal. Cuvier's dwarf caiman seems relatively tolerant of cool water compared to other species of caimans. During the day, individuals sometimes lie up in burrows but at other times rest on piles of rocks or sun themselves while lying, facing the sun, in shallow water with their backs exposed.

== Behaviour and ecology ==
These caimans are mainly nocturnal. Because they occupy many different microhabitats, their diet is believed to vary regionally. Adults feed on fish, amphibians, small mammals, reptiles, birds, crabs, shrimp, molluscs, insects, and other invertebrates, which they catch in the water or on land. Juveniles eat fewer fish, but also consume aquatic & shoreline insects, crustaceans, tadpoles, frogs, and snails, as well as land invertebrates, such as beetles. The prey is mostly swallowed whole and is ground up by stones in the gizzard. In the Pantanal, Cuvier's dwarf caiman estivates in burrows during the dry season and is able to maintain its temperature around 22 °C (72 °F) for days at a time.

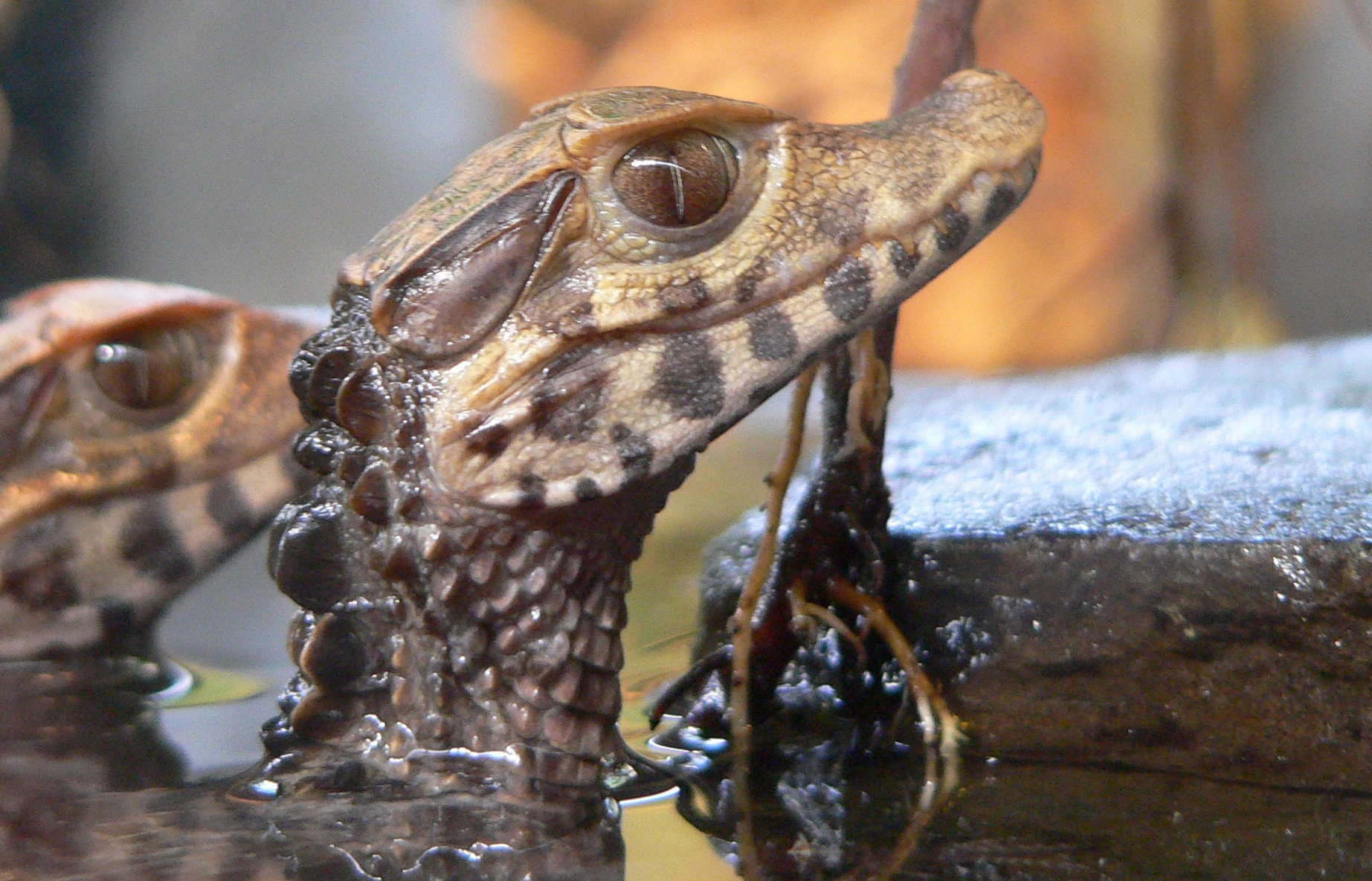
Juveniles at the Cologne Zoological Garden

Adult Cuvier's dwarf caimans are usually found singly or in pairs. The breeding of this species has been little studied, but it does not appear to be seasonal in nature. The female builds a mound nest out of vegetation and mud somewhere in a concealed location and lays a clutch of 10 to 25 eggs, hiding them under further vegetation. Nest temperature varies between 78–88 °F (26–31 °C) and are heated by decaying vegetation. The incubation period is around 90 days and the sex of the hatchlings depends on the temperature of the nest during that time. When the eggs begin to hatch, the female opens the nest in response to the calls made by the young. Newly emerged juveniles have a coating of mucus and may delay entering the water for a few days until this has dried. Its continuing presence on their skin is believed to reduce algal growth. The female stays with the young for around a year, with the longest recorded care extending to 21 months. After this the hatchlings disperse. The young grow at a rate around 8 to 10 cm (3 to 4 in) per year. Females reach sexual maturity around 8 years old and males around 6 years old.

Cuvier's dwarf caiman is considered to be a keystone species whose presence in the ecosystem maintains a healthy balance of organisms. In its absence, fish, such as piranhas, might dominate the environment. The eggs and newly hatched young are most at risk and are preyed on by large rats, procyonids, opossums, birds of prey, other caiman, snakes, and herons. Adults are protected by the bony osteoderms under the scales and their main predators are jaguars, green anacondas (Eunectes murinus), and large boa constrictors (Boa constrictor).

The Cuvier's dwarf caiman is the only crocodilian species that seemingly does not perform the near-universal "death roll" technique used by other extant crocodilians for feeding or intra-specific combat. However, this may only be circumstantial, as specimens tested for the behavior may have been acting uncooperatively with the researchers.

== Status and conservation ==
Many crocodilians are hunted for their skins, but this is not the case with the Cuvier's dwarf caiman. This may be because the ventral skin in this species is too heavily armored to make it easy to tan. Some individuals are killed by indigenous peoples for food and some traditional South American cultures believe dwarf caiman teeth protect from snake bites. Others, particularly in Guyana, are collected for the pet trade; but no evidence shows that populations are dwindling as a result. Some threats to this species are from habitat destruction, including the mining of gold, but these are not thought to be of great significance. The estimated total population is over a million individuals.

In its Red List of Threatened Species, the IUCN lists Cuvier's dwarf caiman as being of least concern, which is because its range is extensive, covering much of northern and central South America, and although its population trend is unknown, it appears to be abundant in many of the localities in which it is found. It is listed in Appendix II of CITES.

=== Captive care ===
Cuvier's dwarf caiman can be kept as a pet, though providing suitable care is expensive and requires extremely large enclosures. In many countries, permits or licenses are necessary and most veterinarians have little experience with these exotic animals.

== See also ==
- Smallest organisms
