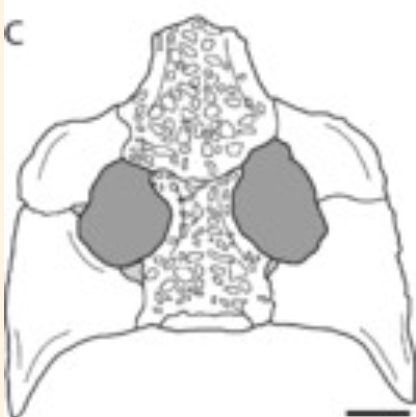
- Holotype skull

Scientific classification
- Kingdom: Animalia
- Phylum: Chordata
- Class: Reptilia
- Order: Crocodylia
- Family: Alligatoridae
- Subfamily: Caimaninae
- Genus: †Protocaiman; Bona et al., 2018
- Species: †P. peligrensis

Binomial name
- †Protocaiman peligrensis Bona et al., 2018

= Protocaiman =

Protocaiman Temporal range: Paleocene, 66–61.6 Ma

Extinct genus of reptiles

Protocaiman is a caimanine genus of crocodylian first described in 2018. The type species Protocaiman peligrensis was discovered in Argentina's Salamanca Formation, and lived in Patagonia during the Paleocene epoch. The holotype is specimen MLP 80-X-10-1, which is a partial skull.
