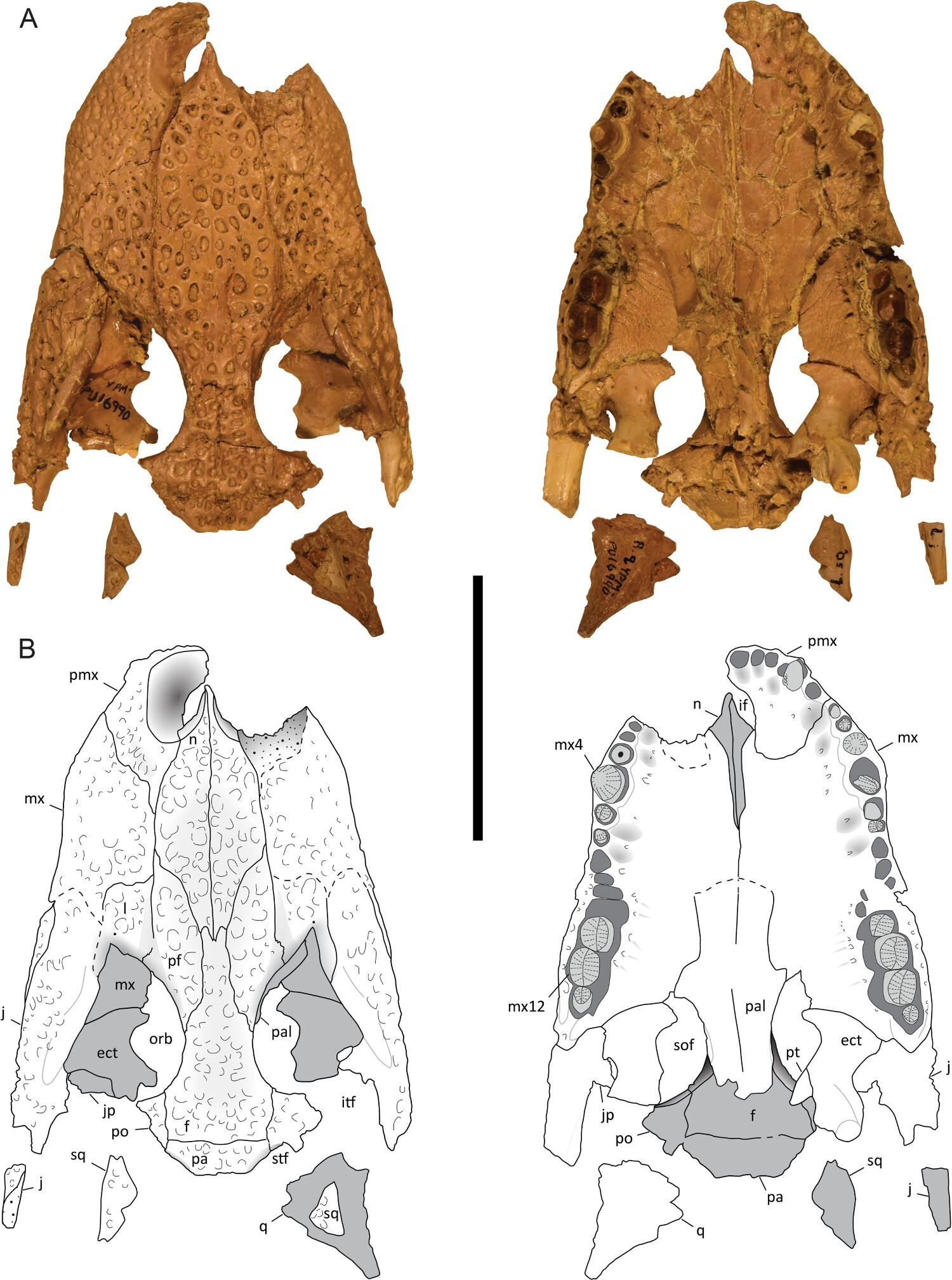
- Holotype skull

Scientific classification
- Kingdom: Animalia
- Phylum: Chordata
- Class: Reptilia
- Order: Crocodylia
- Family: Alligatoridae
- Subfamily: Alligatorinae
- Genus: †Ahdeskatanka; Cossette & Tarailo, 2024

Type species
- †Ahdeskatanka russlanddeutsche Cossette & Tarailo, 2024

= Ahdeskatanka =

Ahdeskatanka Temporal range: Early Eocene Wasatchian

Genus of alligator

Ahdeskatanka is an extinct genus of alligator from the Early Eocene Golden Valley Formation of North Dakota, US. Ahdeskatanka had a short, rounded snout with globular teeth that are well-suited for crushing hard-shelled prey, though its exact ecology is not known. Ahdeskatanka inhabited the vast wetlands that covered much of western North Dakota during the Early Eocene Climatic Optimum, an environment it shared with at least three other crocodilians. These include the large caiman Chrysochampsa and at least two unnamed forms, one a large crocodyloid and one more similar to Ahdeskatanka. Phylogenetic analysis suggests that it was an early diverging member of the Alligatorinae, possibly related to Allognathosuchus, though its position is not very stable. Only a single species, Ahdeskatanka russlanddeutsche, is placed in this genus.

== History and naming ==
Ahdeskatanka was named in 2024 by Adam Cossette and David Tarailo based on a nearly complete skull recovered from the Early Eocene Golden Valley Formation of North Dakota, with the authors describing several additional specimens that they also referred to the genus. These remains were recovered sometime between 1958 and 1961 during a large field expedition conducted by Glenn Jepsen of Princeton University, which recovered a plethora of crocodilian remains from the White Butte and Turtle Valley sites (collectively referred to as the South Heart Locality).

The name Ahdeskatanka is derived from the Dakota word "Ahdeṡkaṭaƞka", which means "alligator". Meanwhile, the species name "russlanddeutsche" is of German origin and means "Germans from Russia". Both names were chosen to reflect the inhabitants of the lands where the fossil material was found, with peoples speaking the Dakota language having been the original inhabitants and ethnic Germans hailing from the Russian Empire having settled in North Dakota during the late 19th century.

== Description ==
Ahdeskatanka was a small-bodied alligatorine with a wide head and blunt teeth. The animal's snout alone is wider than it is long and it had an overbite like modern alligators.

The external nares (nostrils) were large and faced upwards, as is typical for crocodilians. Most of the edge of the nares was formed by the premaxillae, though towards the back the nasal bones enter the opening and extend around halfway into it, separating the nares into two connected hemispheres. Though roughly circular in shape, the lateral edges of the nares are linear, which is unusual for basal alligatoroids and somewhat resembles the anatomy of Procaimanoidea utahensis (though the two differ in the other aspects of the nares). The premaxillae extend back into the space between the nasal bones and the maxillae, forming a thin and unusually long dorsal process that ends at the same level where the sixth maxillary teeth are located. The maxillae are short and wide and thus contribute to the blunt appearance of Ahdeskatanka's head. Due to how long the dorsal processes of the premaxillae are, the maxillae only contact the nasals for a very short distance, much less than what can be seen in related alligatorids. The back end of each maxilla exhibits three processes of differing length. The innermost process is the smallest, and contacts the lacrimal bone. The intermediate process extends into the space between the lacrimal and the jugal bone and the longest of the three processes extends along the lower surface of the jugal.

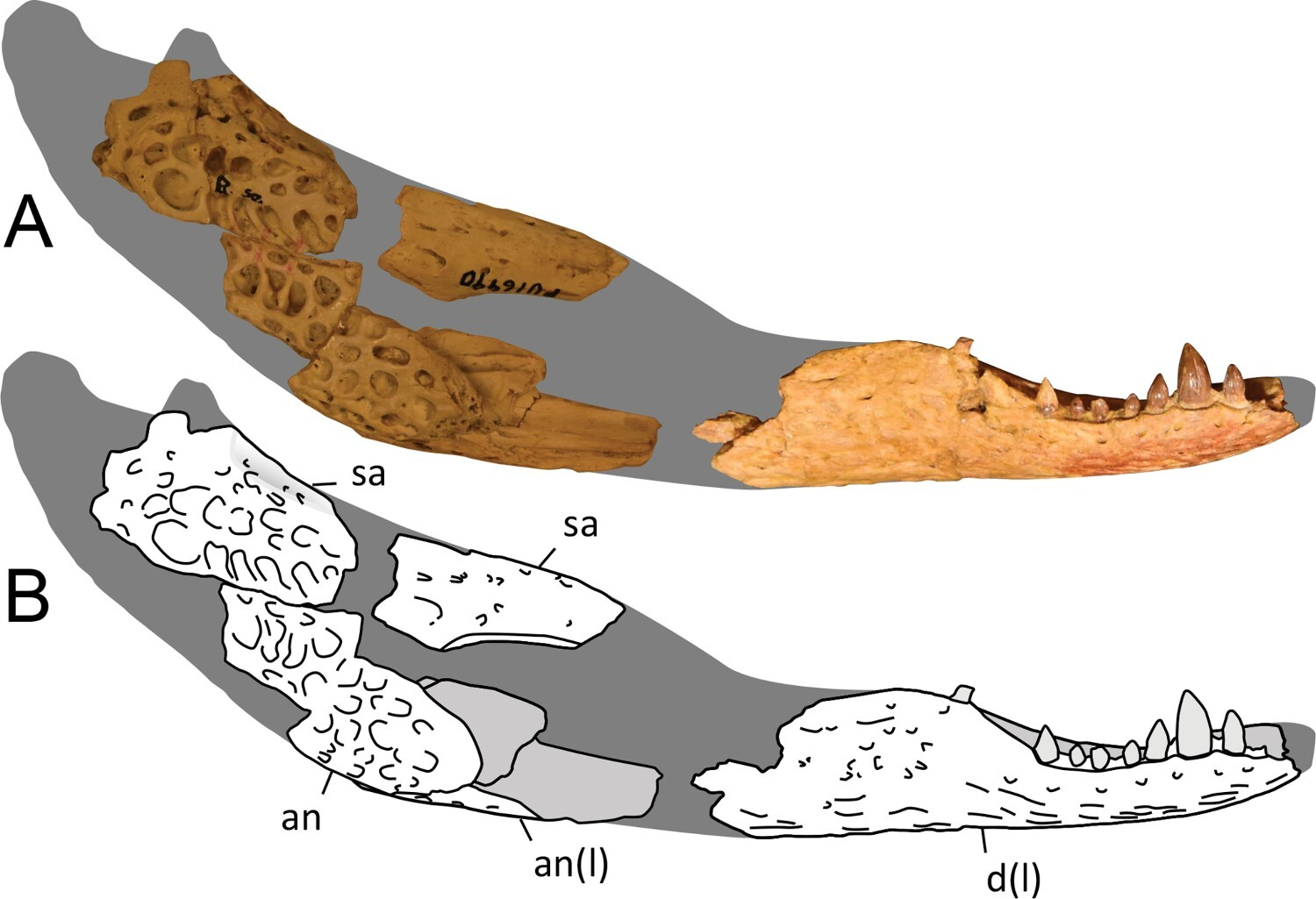
The lower jaw of Ahdeskatanka.

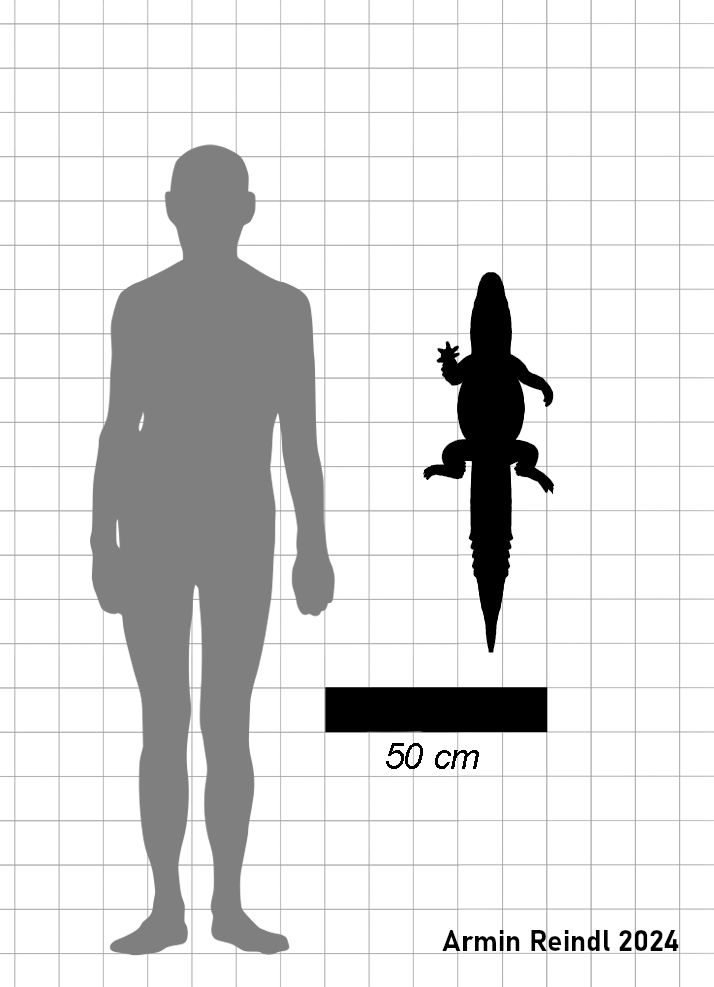
Size comparison of Ahdeskatanka

The eyesockets (orbits) are teardrop-shaped and closely resemble those of Allognathosuchus wartheni, though they are proportionally larger in Ahdeskatanka. The prefrontal bone exhibits a triangular process that extends into the lacrimal right where the two bones form the edge of the eyesocket. Notably, the front tip of the prefrontal extends beyond that of the lacrimal much further than in related species. The lacrimal forms much of the pointed anterior end of the eyesocket, which gives the back of the bone the shape of an inverted V. The jugal extends almost as far forward as the lacrimal. The frontal bridges the snout with the skull table and forms the bony bridge that separates the eyesockets. Its contact with the nasal is complex and trident-shaped, with the two outer prongs being longer than the central one. On the skull table the frontal contacts both postorbital bones and the parietal bone. The contact is entirely located on the skull table and does not involve the supratemporal fenestra as is the case in some other crocodilians. Especially notable is the fact that the fronto-parietal contact is straight, whereas the suture is concave or convex in related taxa.

Though the mandible is not completely known, it was likely short and robust with a tall jaw joint based on the known bones and the anatomy of the upper jaw.

=== Dentition ===
Each premaxilla contains five teeth. The fourth tooth was enlarged, with the first three and the fifth being smaller and roughly equal in size. Each maxilla contains thirteen teeth, the largest of which is the fourth. Shifts in the size of the alveoli indicate that the maxillary teeth shrink and grow in size throughout the jaw. After the large fourth tooth, the maxillary alveoli grow smaller until the sixth, followed by an enlarged socket for the seventh tooth and a small eighth. Following these the alveoli once again begin to increase in size until the penultimate tooth, which has a tooth socket about twice as wide as that of the final thirteenth maxillary tooth. The distal maxillary teeth, those towards the back of the jaw, are described as blunt and approximately even in terms of the length to width ratio.

The dentary teeth occlude lingual to those of the premaxillary and maxillary toothrow, meaning that much like modern alligators and unlike true crocodiles, Ahdeskatanka would have had an overbite.

== Phylogeny ==
The description of Ahdeskatanka provides two phylogenetic trees, one showcasing the strict consensus of the conducted analysis and a second Adams consensus tree that aims to showcase an improved resolution within the group. As such, the latter tree preserves not only the clades recovered by the strict consensus tree but further dissolves certain polytomies present in the former. In both instances Alligatoroidea contains only a handful of basally branching forms like Deinosuchus, Leidyosuchus and Diplocynodon before splitting into the two major groups still around to this day, the Alligatorinae and the Caimaninae. While the contemporary Chrysochampsa is recovered as an early offshoot of the caimanine subfamily, Ahdeskatanka was found to be an early-branching alligatorine. However, it is noted that Ahdeskatanka is one of a few labile taxa within the tree and that its relationship is not well supported. This also applies to the genus Allodaposuchus, which was recovered as a close relative by the Adams consensus.

- Alligatoroidea
  - †Deinosuchus
  - - †Leidyosuchus
    - - †Diplocynodon
      - Alligatoridae
        - †Hassiacosuchus
        - - †Navajosuchus
          - †Ceratosuchus
        - - Caimaninae
          - Alligatorinae
            - - †Ahdeskatanka russlanddeutsche
              - †Allognathosuchus polyodon
              - †Allognathosuchus wartheni
            - - †Arambourgia
              - †Procaimanoidea kayi
              - †Procaimanoidea utahensis
            - - †Alligator prenasalis
              - †Alligator mcgrewi
            - - †Wannaganosuchus
              - - †Alligator olseni
                - - Alligator sinensis (Chinese alligator)
                  - - Alligator mississippiensis (American alligator)
                    - †Alligator mefferdi
                    - †Alligator thomsoni

== Paleobiology ==
=== Paleoenvironment ===
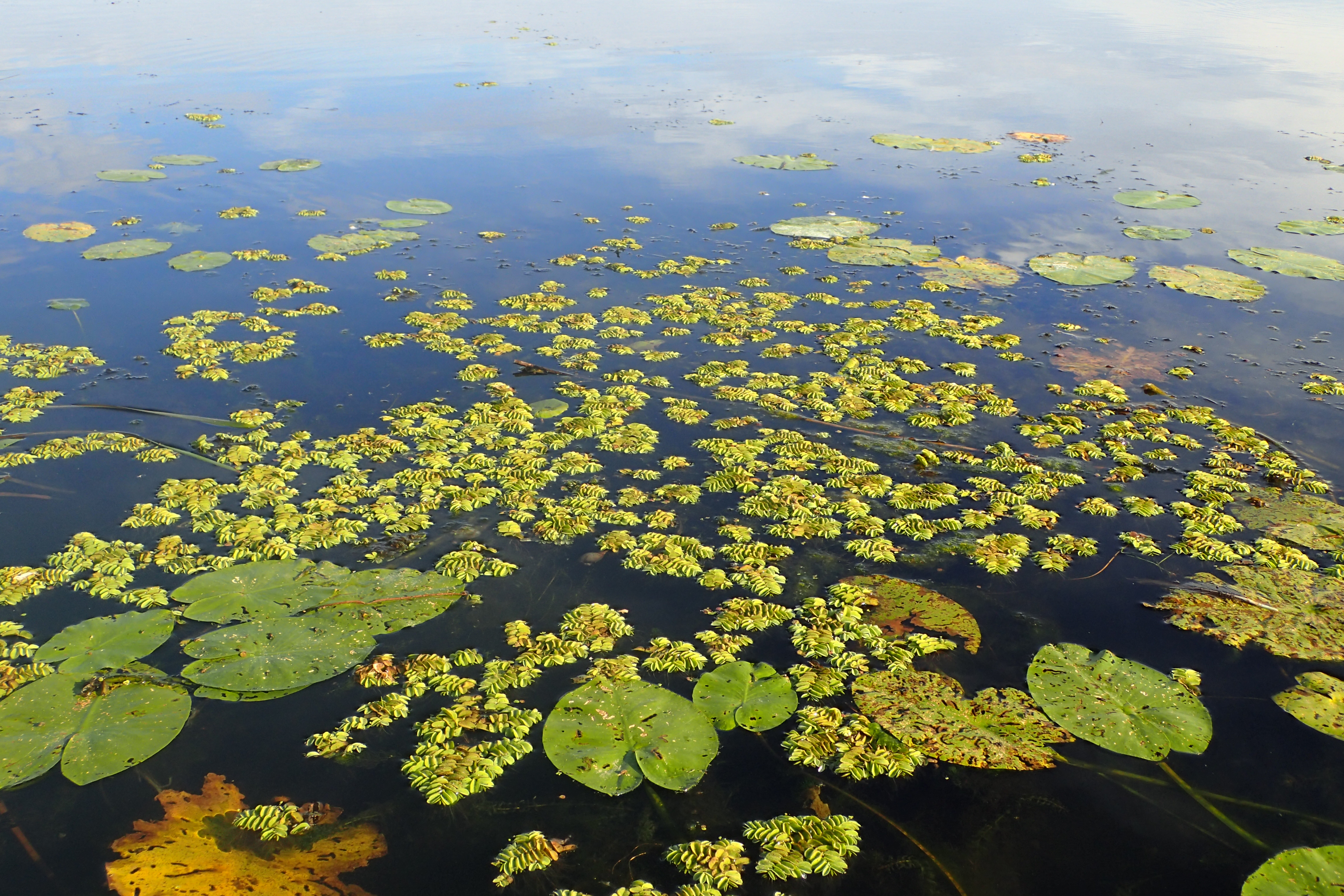
One important plant to inhabit the rivers and swamps of the Golden Valley Formation was the floating fern Salvinia.

The Camel's Butte Member of the Golden Valley Formation was deposited during the Early Eocene Climatic Optimum, a time of heightened global temperatures, faunal turnovers and an increase in plant diversity. Accordingly, North Dakota was warm and humid in this period, with the mean annual temperature for the Golden Valley Formation being 18.5 °C. The environment consisted of lowland swamps and subtropical forests that grew along the banks of meandering rivers and streams. Analysis of the leaf fossils of the formation suggests the presence of at least 41 species of megaflora, including both terrestrial forms like ferns, conifers, and dicots and also floating and rooted aquatic plants. Overall the Golden Valley flora is similar to that of the Paleocene Fort Union Group. This includes the floating fern Salvinia preauriculata, which is regarded as an important index fossil showcasing the transition from the Paleocene to the Eocene across the formation's deposition. Cossette and Tarailo do however note that the environment saw considerable change between the time of Ahdeskatanka and more recent sediments towards the top of the formation, when swamps started to become rarer.

Mammal fossils are also known from the formation, represented by the ungulates Homogalax and Hyopsodus, various early primates like Pelycodus and Teilhardina, the multituberculate Parectypodus and even dental remains tentatively assigned to the hyaenodont Sinopa. Carnivorans have also been identified with Miacis and Didymictis. Generally, carnivores appear to have either been smaller or rarer at the sites yielding crocodile remains, which is consistent with the dominant swamp habitat which would have put crocodiles at an advantage relative to mammalian predators.

As expected from an environment dominated by swamps and rivers, the Golden Valley Formation has produced a plethora of fossils belonging to aquatic and semi-aquatic animals. Fish are represented in part by bowfins and gars and amphibians by frogs and salamanders (including the genera Batrachosauroides and Chrysoriton). A number of freshwater turtles are also known, including Baptemys, Echmatemys and Plastomenus, as well as softshell turtles of the genus Trionyx.

=== Crocodilian fauna and paleoecology ===
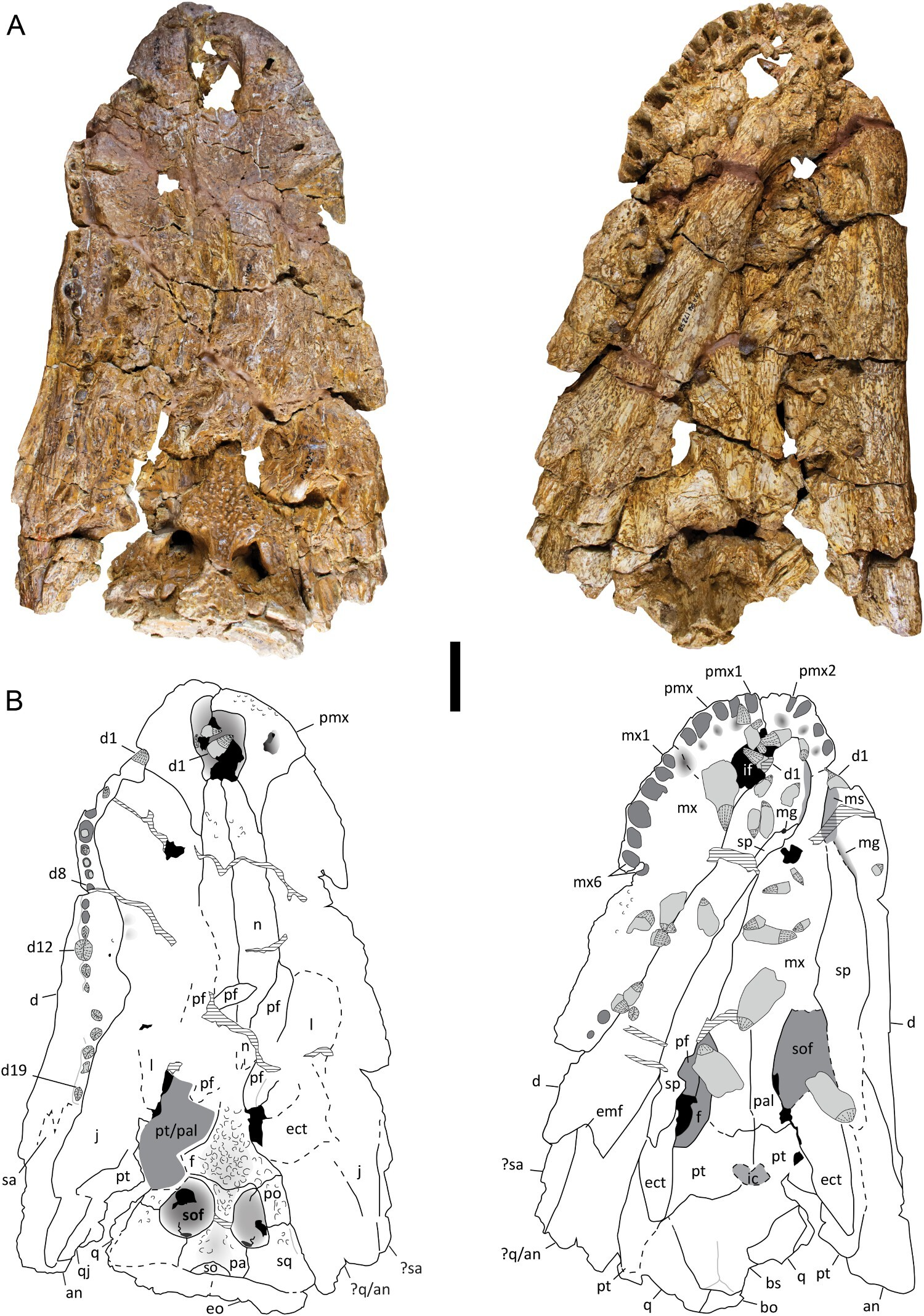
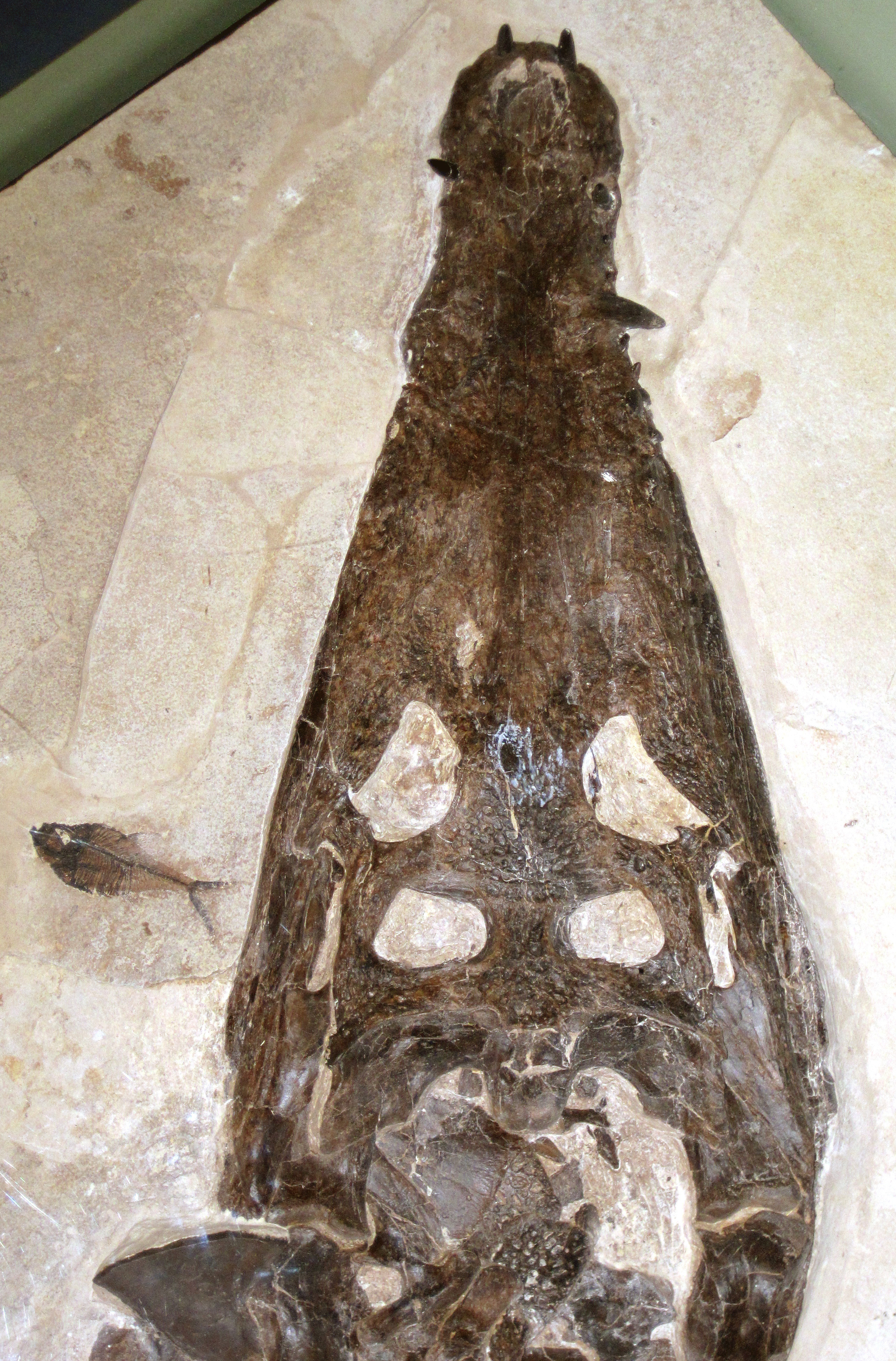
The largest crocodilians of the Golden Valley Formation were the caiman Chrysochampsa (left) and a crocodyloid similar to Borealosuchus (right).

Much of the material recovered from the Golden Valley Formation is too isolated to attribute to any particular crocodilian, however, evidence supports the idea that the area was inhabited by several species. The best known contemporary of Ahdeskatanka is Chrysochampsa, a large-bodied generalist of the caimanine subfamily of alligatorids. Specimen YPM VPPU.030625 is regarded as fairly similar to, but still distinct from, Ahdeskatanka and might represent a closely related animal. At least one crocodyloid appears to have been present as well, with fossil material preserving lower jaws that took on a more pointed and V-shaped appearance and which possess pointed teeth. In some ways this taxon resembles the widespread genus Borealosuchus, although it differs in some aspects of the anatomy. Teeth and osteoderms further support the presence of a Borealosuchus-like crocodyloid.

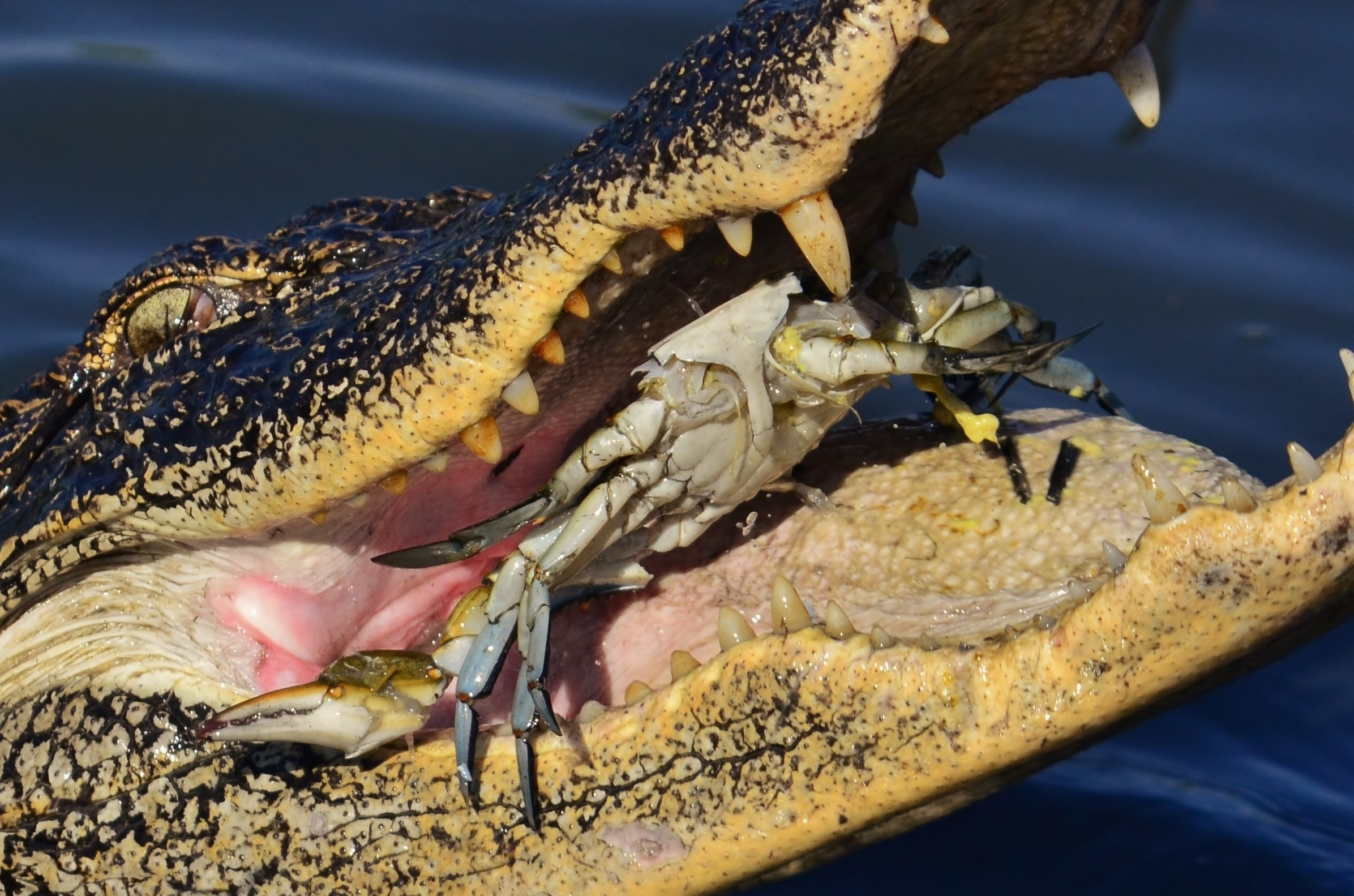
While the blunt teeth of Ahdeskatanka would have been well suited for dealing with hard-shelled prey, it could have still been fairly generalized.

Cossette & Tarailo remark that, in many cases where multiple extant crocodilians overlap in their range, these do not represent true coexistence and instead are simply instances of different taxa inhabiting separate habitats within a given area. While this separation cannot be directly applied to the crocodilian fauna of the Golden Valley Formation, the authors do note that they at the very least would have been able to coexist more easily by inhabiting different ecological niches.

Both Chrysochampsa and the indeterminate crocodyloid represent large generalist taxa, with the former having a broad snout similar to that of today's American alligators and the latter having a V-shaped snout reminiscent of modern true crocodiles. Ahdeskatanka was on the other side of the spectrum and, like the species represented by YPM VPPU.030625, represents a smaller type of crocodilian with a blunt snout and rounded teeth. This morphology is widespread among the alligatoroids of the Paleogene and traditionally associated with a diet of hard-shelled prey, which may have been ground up with the help of the elevated jaw joints. Though there is debate on whether or not these animals were indeed specialists or actually more generalized in their diet, the anatomy and size difference clearly indicates that Ahdeskatanka filled a different niche from the larger crocodilians of its environment.

An additional layer of complexity is added by the various growth stages of the Golden Valley Formation crocodilians, as only large adults of the larger taxa would function as apex predators while younger individuals would instead be relegated to the role of mesopredators. Another possible aspect that might set apart Ahdeskatanka from Chrysochampsa is the degree to which they were water-bound. Cossette and Tarailo note that smaller crocodilians are often more terrestrial, which means they would have had an easier time moving through forested terrain, allowing them to move through the woods that surround the Paleogene wetlands of North Dakota.
