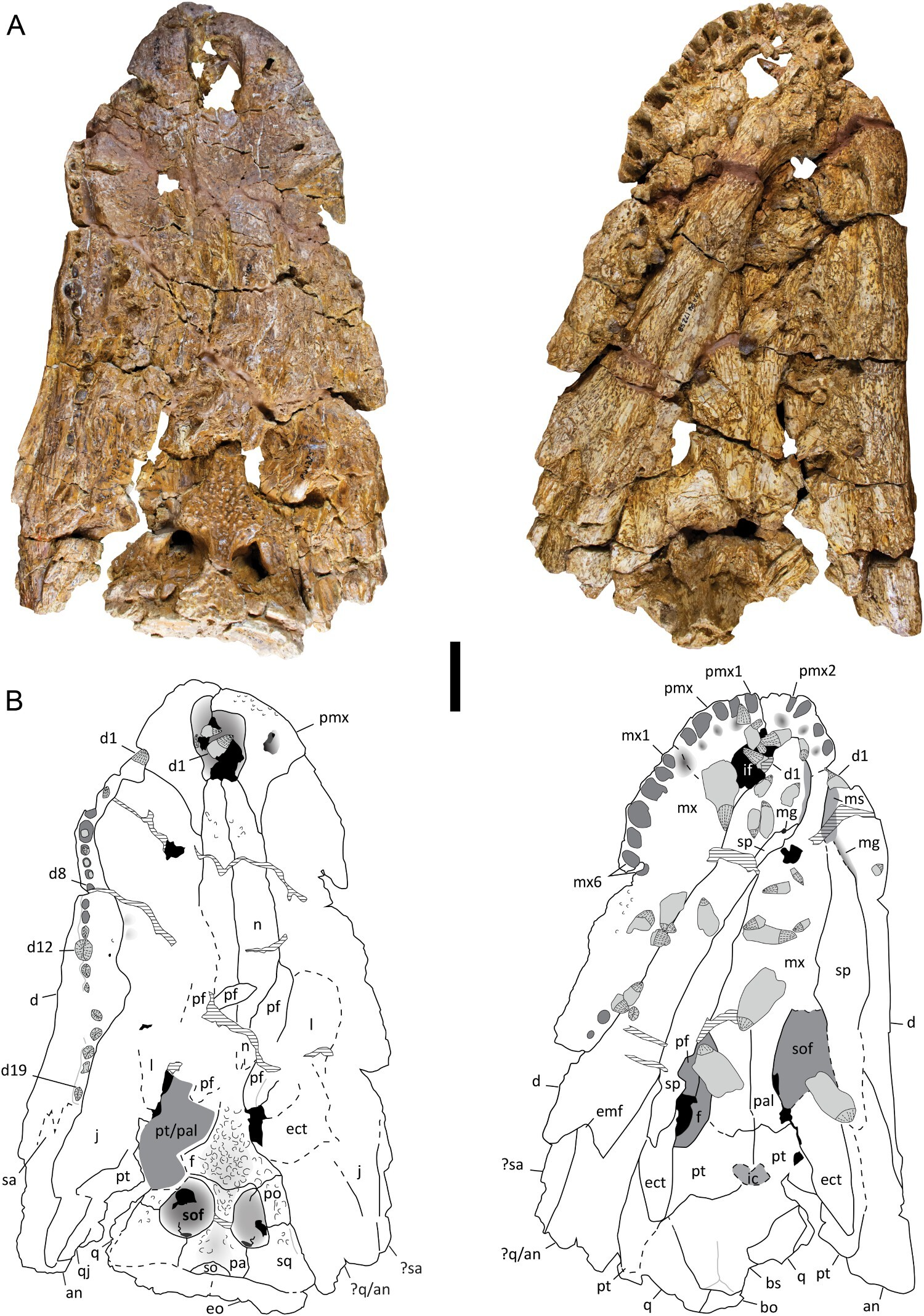
- The holotype skull of Chrysochampsa

Scientific classification
- Kingdom: Animalia
- Phylum: Chordata
- Class: Reptilia
- Clade: Archosauria
- Order: Crocodilia
- Family: Alligatoridae
- Subfamily: Caimaninae
- Genus: †Chrysochampsa; Estes, 1988

Species
- Chrysochampsa mlynarskii Estes, 1988 (type)

= Chrysochampsa =

Chrysochampsa Temporal range: Eocene Wasatchian

Extinct genus of reptiles

Chrysochampsa is an extinct monospecific genus of caiman of the clade Brachychampsini. Fossils have been found from the Golden Valley Formation of North Dakota and date back to the Wasatchian regional North American faunal stage of the early Eocene. During this time North Dakota experienced the Early Eocene Climatic Optimum, creating lush forests, swamps and meandering rivers that were the home to at least four distinct crocodilians. Unlike the contemporary Ahdeskatanka, which was a small animal with crushing teeth, Chrysochampsa would have been a generalist. Due to its size and lack of significant mammalian carnivores, it would have been the apex predator of the region. The genus had been proposed to be synonymous with Allognathosuchus in 2004, but this claim has since then been repeatedly refuted. A 2024 study has recovered it as an early branching member of the Caimaninae, forming a clade with Cretaceous forms such as Brachychampsa. Chrysochampsa is a monotypic genus, containing only the type species, Chrysochampsa mlynarskii.

== History and naming ==
Chrysochampsa was described by Richard Estes in 1988 based on a fairly complete skull and assorted other fossils recovered from the Turtle Valley site of the Golden Valley Formation of North Dakota. However, Estes diagnosis of the new taxon was rather simple, the only distinguishing feature cited being the proportions of the frontal bone. In a 2004 Spencer Lucas and Robert M. Sullivan published a study in which they proposed that Chrysochampsa was simply a species of Allognathosuchus, with an earlier abstract version of the study going as far as suggesting it was synonymous with Allognathosuchus mooki (though Lucas and Sullivan did not go as far in the finalized publication). Their conclusion was criticized by Christopher A. Brochu that same year, who argued that the features used to link Allognathosuchus and Chrysochampsa were universally present among early Cenozoic alligatoroids. It wasn't until 20 years later that another study explicitly dealt with Chrysochampsa again with Adam P. Cossette and David A. Tarailo publishing a full redescription of the genus alongside their description of its smaller contemporary Ahdeskatanka. Not only did their study reaffirm the validity of Chrysochampsa and back it up with an improved diagnosis, they further shed light on the taxon's previously uncertain relationship with other alligatoroids, determining it to be a caiman rather than an alligatorid.

The name Chrysochampsa roughly translates to "golden crocodile" from the Greek "chrysos" and "champsa", a name chosen in reference to the name of the Golden Valley Formation. The species name is a patronym and references polish paleontologist Marian Mlynarski, who Estes chose to honor for his contributions to paleoherpetology.

== Description ==
Chryochampsa was a relatively large crocodilian for its time with a broad snout (approximately a third longer than wide) similar to Albertochampsa and Brachychampsa. The surface of the skull is described as plain, lacking any prominent bosses, ridges or other major structures to adorn it. Looking at the skull from above shows that its edges are not straight, but somewhat sinuous, with a notable expansion in the region of the first six maxillary teeth. There's also a second expansion, tho the compression and deformation that affects the holotype skull makes it unclear where exactly. Like modern alligators and unlike true crocodiles, Chrysochampsa had an overbite, as revealed by the fact that the teeth of the lower jaw left occlusal marks on the lingual side of the toothrow.

The nares of Chrysochampsa are keyhole-shaped and their edges are level with the rest of the surrounding skull surface. Most of the edge of the nares is formed by the premaxillae, with the only exception being the posterior-most edge where the nasal bones contact the opening. In this regard Chrysochampsa bears a resemblance to Stangerochampsa, although the amount of the nasals that extends into the nares is even smaller than in the Cretaceous taxon. On its underside the premaxillae preserve the incisive foramen, though it is largely obscured. Based on what is visible, it appears to have been teardrop-shaped and possibly intersected the lower premaxillary-maxillary suture. When viewed from above, the premaxillae form a long and thin posterior process that extends back to the position of the fourth maxillary tooth. The maxillae are proportionally longer than in other members of Brachychampsini and broadly contact the premaxillae and nasal bones. Like in Brachychampsa montana, the maxillae form a small V-shaped process that extends in-between the prefrontal bone and the lacrimal bone.

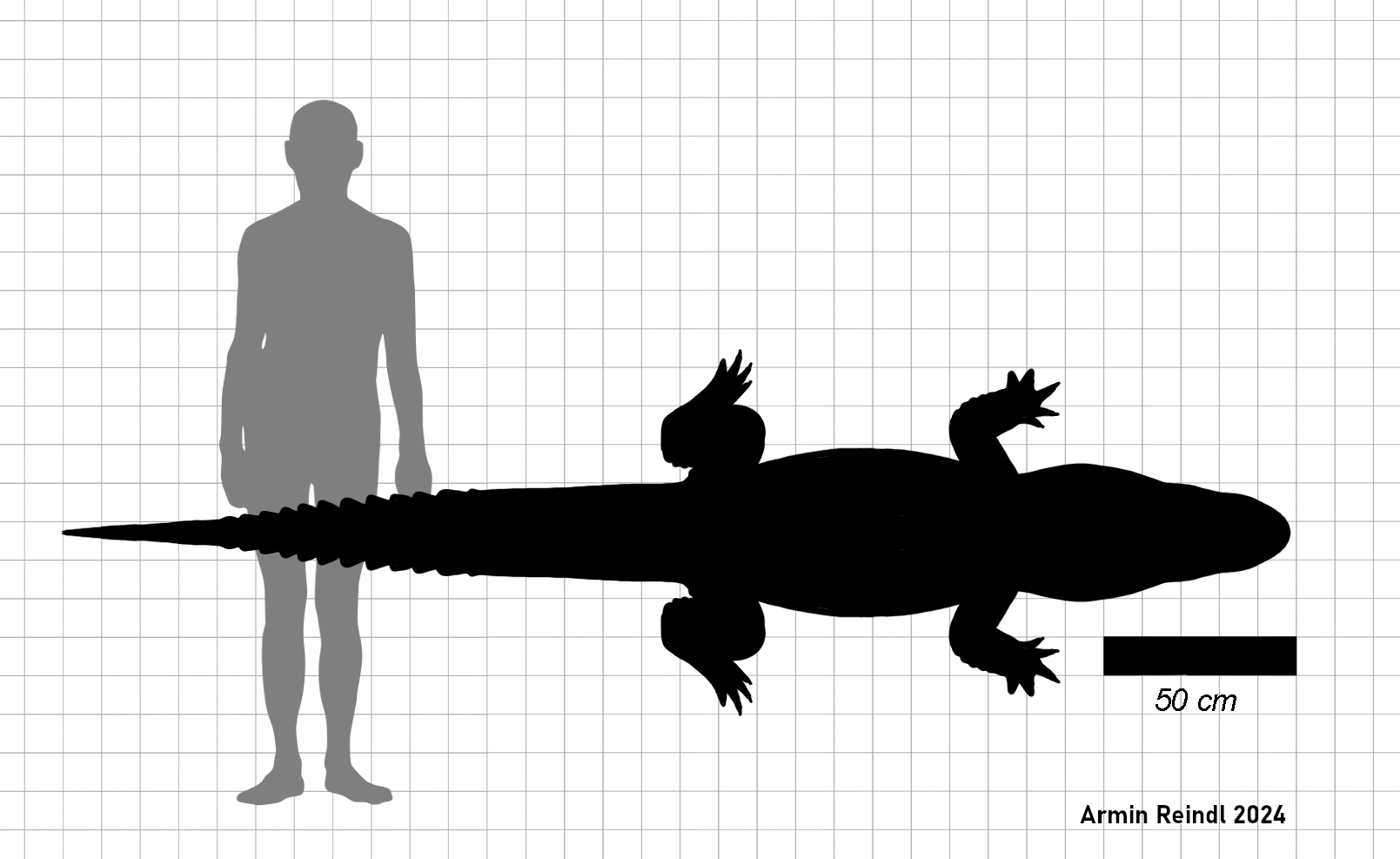
Size comparison of Chrysochampsa.

One of the first diagnostic traits recognized for Chrysochampsa was the particular shape of the frontal bone. Ever since the original description by Estes, it has been noted for the fact that the region between the eyes was incredibly narrow, yet widened significantly once entering the skull table. There, the frontal contacts the parietal bone and the postorbitals, forming a three-way suture that briefly contacts the large, semicircular supratemporal fenestrae. This means that the frontal. Unlike in other forms, where the postorbitals play a part in forming the margins of the eyesockets, this rolle is entirely filled by the frontal in Chrysochampsa. This is in part due to the shape, as in Chrysochampsa the postorbitals are more rectangular, while they are boomerang-shaped in the animal's closest relatives. The parietal is hourglass-shaped and the squamosals, which form the back corners of the skull table, are boomerang-shaped. Like in Brachychampsa but different from Albertochampsa and Stangerochampsa, the supraoccipital bone actually makes a visible contribution to the dorsal surface of the skull table, appearing as a wider than long and crescent-shaped element at the very back of the structure.

The lower jaw of Chrysochampsa is described as U-shaped and robust. The mandibular symphysis, the region where the two halves of the lower jaw meet, is formed mostly by the dentary bone and to a lesser extent by the splenial. The symphysis ends at approximately the level of the fourth dentary alveolus, which would house the largest tooth in the lower jaw.

=== Dentition ===
Each premaxilla of Chrysochampsa contained five teeth of varying size. Based on the alveoli, the first two teeth were small, followed by a larger third tooth and a fourth that was the largest and a fifth that resembled the first two in size. The maxillary toothrow begins small but the size of the individual teeth grows rapidly leading up to the fourth maxillary tooth before they decrease in size again. The lower jaw contains 19 dentary teeth per hemimandible, with the individual tooth sockets circular to ovoid in appearance. The teeth themselves bear slight carinae (cutting edges) and striations. The early teeth of the lower jaw, like those in the premaxillae, show a size increase from the first to the fourth, with the fourth being the largest of the entire lower jaw as is common in crocodilians. After this the teeth grow smaller and then larger again, reaching their peak with the 12th tooth (which is the second largest tooth of the entire lower jaw) before reducing in size once more.

=== Postcrania ===
Relatively few postcranial elements of Chrysochampsa are described, including the unkeeled osteoderms and the intercentrum of the atlas, the first neck vertebrae. The osteoderms are described as squared and similar to those of other members of the Alligatoridae, yet differing from the closely related Brachychampsa. The intercentrum of the atlas is plate shaped as it is naturally dorsoventrally (top to bottom) compressed, anatomy that is also common in alligatorids.

== Phylogeny ==
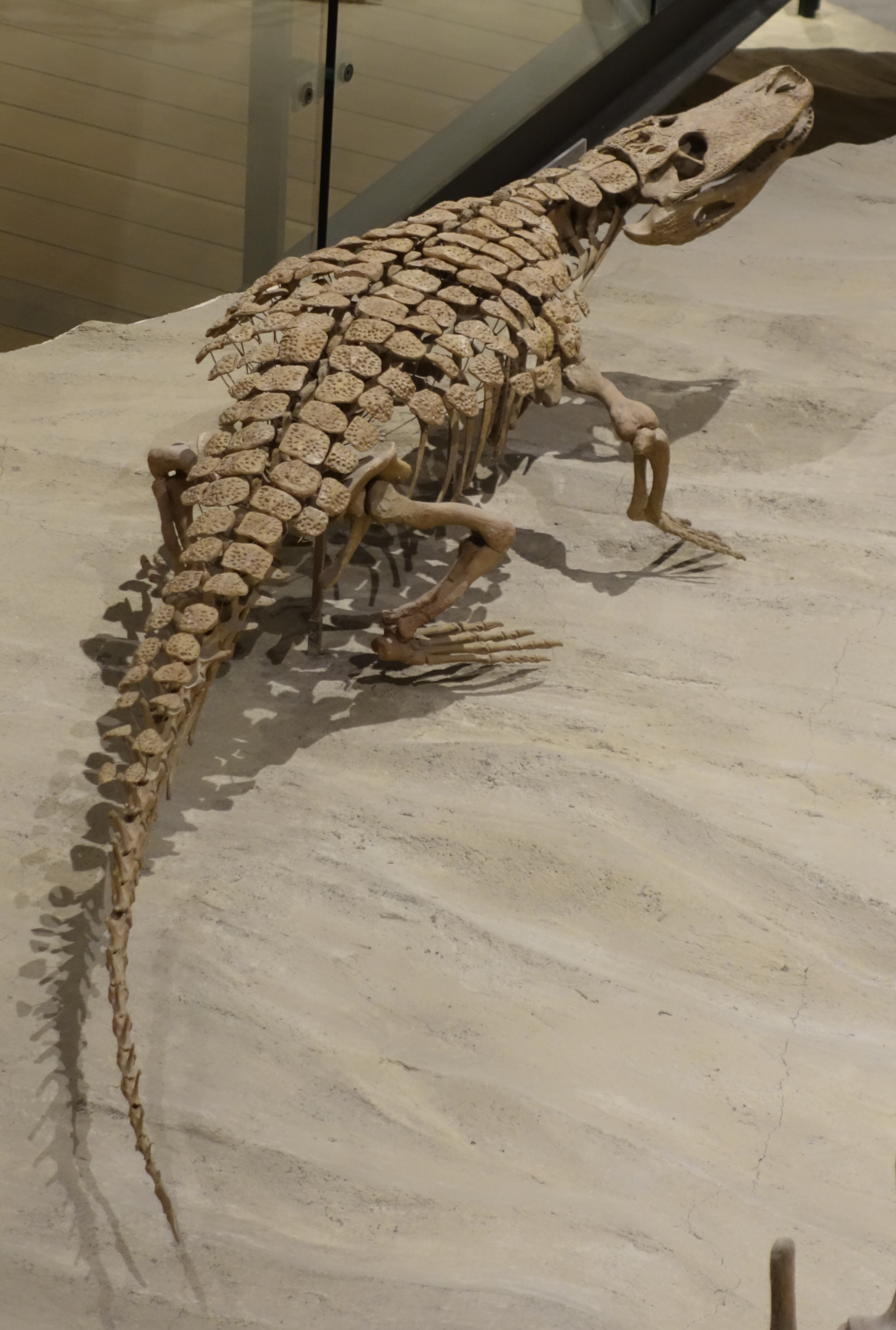
It is now believed that Brachychampsa was the closest known relative to Chrysochampsa.

The relationship between Chrysochampsa and other alligatoroids has long remained elusive. Though it was originally described as an alligatorid by Estes, Christopher Brochu did not include it in his 1999 study on alligatoroid phylogenetics as he considered the taxon a wildcard, appearing in so many possible positions that it caused the collapse of the strict consensus trees. The next attempt to resolve the position of Chrysochampsa was conducted by Jessica Miller-Camp in 2016 and did prove fruitfull. This thesis recovered it as the basalmost member of Globidonta, diverging from other alligatoroids after Deinosuchus and Diplocynodon but before Brachychampsa, Albertochampsa, Stangerochampsa and the split between alligatorines and caimanines.

The most thorough examination of the phylogenetic position of Chrysochampsa stems from the 2024 study by Cossette and Tarailo, who provided a redescription and amended diagnosis for the animal. Their study found that Chrysochampsa formed a clade with multiple Cretaceous forms, namely Brachychampsa montana, Brachychampsa sealyi, Albertochampsa langstoni and Stangerochampsa mccabei. This clade, which was found to be the earliest-diverging branch of caimans, was dubbed Brachychampsini.

- Alligatoroidea
  - †Deinosuchus
  - - †Leidyosuchus
    - - †Diplocynodon
      - Alligatoridae
        - †Hassiacosuchus
        - - †Navajosuchus
          - †Ceratosuchus
        - - Alligatorinae
          - Caimaninae
            - Brachychampsini
              - Stangerochampsa
              - Albertochampsa
              - - Chrysochampsa
                - Brachychampsa
            - - Culebrasuchus
              - - Eocaiman
                - - Necrosuchus
                  - Centenariosuchus
                  - - - Tsoabichi
                      - - Bottosaurus
                        - Paleosuchus
                    - - - Mourasuchus
                        - Purussaurus
                      - - - Caiman crocodilus (Spectacled caiman)
                          - Caiman yacare (Yacare caiman)
                        - - Caiman latirostris (Broad-snouted caiman)
                          - Caiman lutescens
                          - - Melanosuchus fischeri
                            - Melanosuchus niger (Black caiman)

== Paleobiology ==
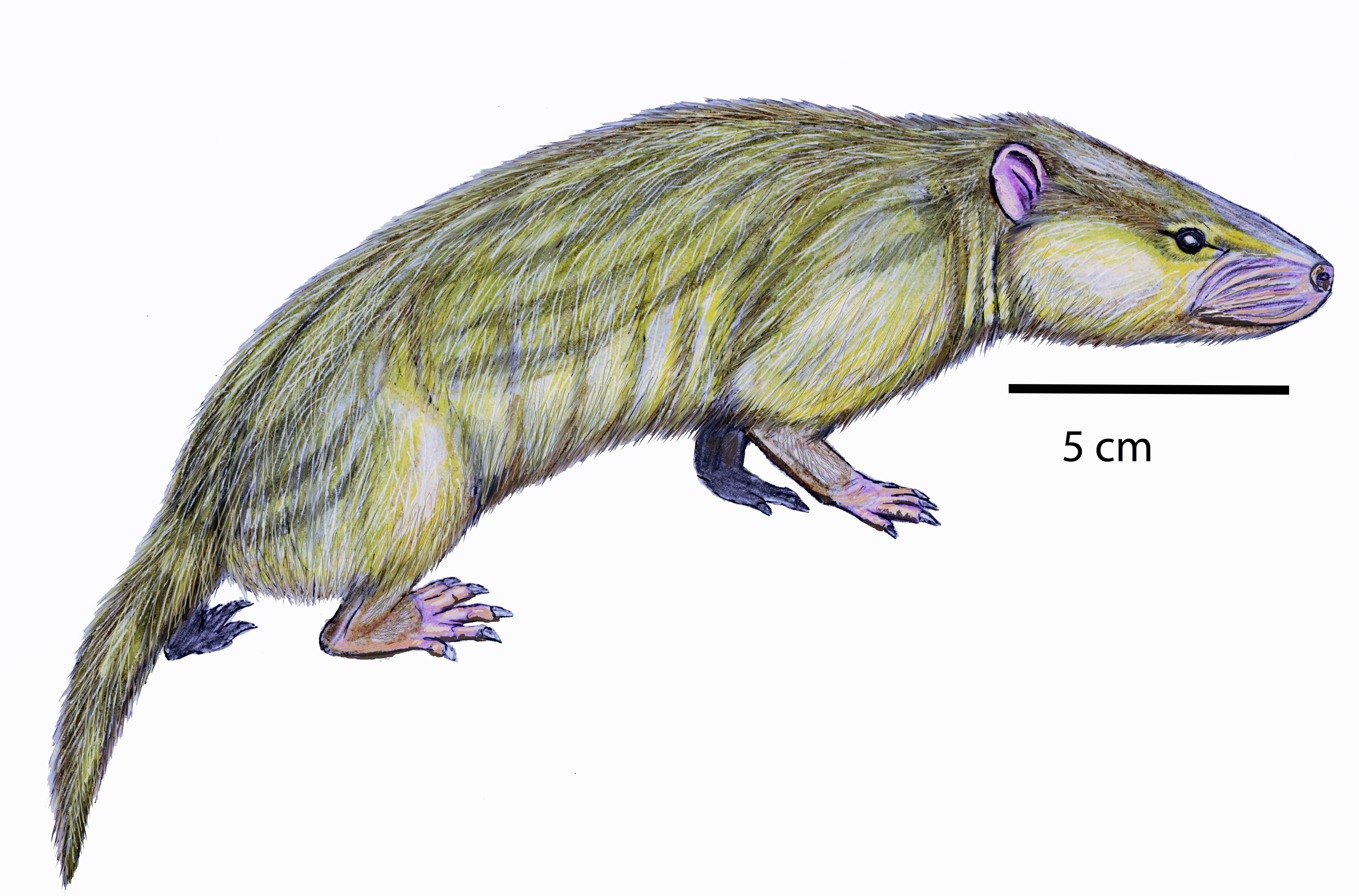
Early ungulates like Hyopsodus may have been preyed on by Chrysochampsa.

=== Paleoenvironment ===
Chrysochampsa lived during the Early Eocene Climatic Optimum in what is now the Golden Valley Formation of North Dakota. During this time of increased global temperatures, faunal turnover and plant diversification, North Dakota was warm and humid, with mean annual temperature being 18.5 °C. The environment inhabited by Chrysochampsa consisted of lowland swamps, meandering rivers and streams and subtropical to tropical forests that grew along their banks. At least 41 species of macroflora have been identified from the formation including both terrestrial forms like ferns, conifers, and dicots and also floating and rooted aquatic plants. One common plant from the formation was the floating fern Salvinia preauriculata.

Various mammals have been recovered from the Golden Valley Formation, consisting of ungulates like Homogalax and Hyopsodus, early primates like Pelycodus and Teilhardina and even a multituberculate, Parectypodus. Carnivorous mammals are rarer and often on the smaller scale, but also present. Among these are teeth tentatively assigned to the hyaenodont Sinopa and fossils of the carnivorans Miacis and Didymictis.

In addition to the crocodiles of the formation, these swamps and streams were inhabited by a wide range of aquatic and semi-aquatic animals. Fish are represented in part by bowfins and gars and amphibians by frogs and salamanders (including the genera Batrachosauroides and Chrysoriton). A number of freshwater turtles are also known, including Baptemys, Echmatemys and Plastomenus, as well as softshell turtles of the genus Trionyx.

=== Crocodilian fauna and paleoecology ===
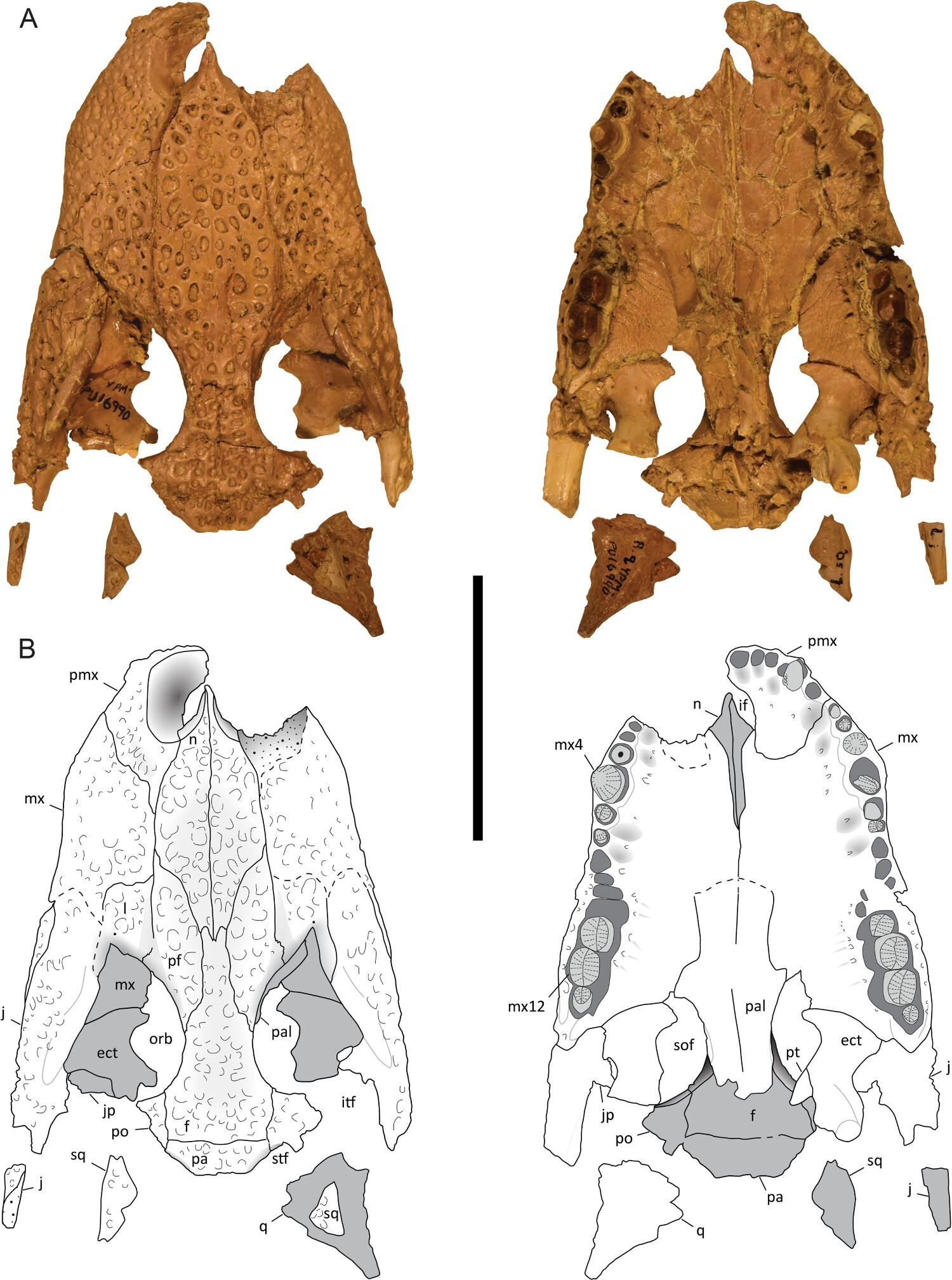
Chrysochampsa lived alongside the much smaller Ahdeskatanka, an early alligatorine with crushing dentition.

Crocodilian remains are especially abundant in the sediments of the Golden Valley Formation and are known to represent anywhere from four to five distinct forms. Two of these, Ahdeskatanka and an as of yet unnamed related form, are small-bodied alligatorines with blunt snouts and globular teeth that would be well suited for crushing hard shelled prey. A much larger crocodilian of the Golden Valley Formation is represented by an unnamed crocodyloid that exhibits a V-shaped lower jaw and pointed teeth. In many regards, this taxon may be similar to Borealosuchus, which was widespread across the United States during the Late Cretaceous and early Neogene.

Chrysochampsa itself is similar to the unnamed crocodyloid in that it is among the large crocodilians of the formation. Unlike its Cretaceous relatives, Chrysochampsa had more conical teeth that, combined with its robust snout, draw comparison to modern American alligators. Like them and the contemporary crocodyloid, Chrysochampsa was likely a generalist predator capable of preying on almost anything that it could swallow. Given that the Golden Valley Formation was dominated by rivers and swamps, Chrysochampsa would have had a considerable advantage over the local mammal carnivorans, possibly explaining their relative rarity in the sediments. Notably, the fact that Chrysochampsa possessed conical rather than globular teeth, differentiating it from its closest relatives, might suggest that it had to adapt to such a generalist lifestyle due to increased competition with the small-bodied alligatoroids that possessed crushing dentition.

Cossette and Tarailo do note that the recovery of the many crocodilians from the Golden Valley Formation may not necessarily represent true sympatry, as today many crocodilians overlap in range but are often separated by habitat preferences. For example, though Chrysochampsa and Ahdeskatanka could have inhabited the same environment, the fact alone that the latter was notably smaller meant that it could have more easily entered and navigated the forests that grew alongside the river banks and around the swamps, while Chrysochampsa, owing to its larger size, would have been more water-bound. At the same time, there is clear evidence for some niche partitioning among the forms, with their different sizes and morphologies allowing them to exploit different niches within the same biome. Again Chrysochampsa bears the hallmarks of being a generalist feeding on a wide range of prey including the local mammal fauna, whereas Ahdeskatanka had crushing dentition (though the degree of specialisation is uncertain). Further complexity is also added by the animal's growth cycles. Cossette and Tarailo highlight that only mature adults would be considered true apex predators, whereas younger individuals would fill the rolle of mesopredator instead.
