= Culebrasuchus =

Culebrasuchus Temporal range: Early-Mid Miocene (Hemingfordian) ~20.6–16.3 Ma

Scientific classification
- Kingdom: Animalia
- Phylum: Chordata
- Class: Reptilia
- Clade: Archosauria
- Order: Crocodilia
- Family: Alligatoridae
- Subfamily: Caimaninae
- Genus: †Culebrasuchus; Hastings et al., 2013

Type species
- †Culebrasuchus mesoamericanus Hastings et al., 2013

Extinct genus of reptiles

Culebrasuchus is an extinct, monotypic genus of caiman alligatorid known from the Early to Middle Miocene (Hemingfordian) of the Panama Canal Zone of Panama. It contains a single species, Culebrasuchus mesoamericanus.

== Discovery ==
Culebrasuchus was first described and named by Alexander K. Hastings, Jonathan I. Bloch, Carlos A. Jaramillo, Aldo F. Rincona and Bruce J. Macfadden in 2013 based on a single holotype skull and three neck vertebrae from the Culebra Formation. Culebrasuchus is thought to be the most basal member of Caimaninae, meaning that it represents the earliest radiation of caimans in the Americas. The ancestor of Culebrasuchus likely lived farther north, perhaps in what is now southern Mexico, because before the Miocene most of Panama was underwater. The movement of Culebrasuchus into the Panama Canal Zone was an early part of the Great American Interchange in which animals dispersed between North and South America across the newly formed Isthmus of Panama (although during the Early Miocene it had not yet formed, with 200 km of ocean still separating the continents). However, Culebrasuchus was not the earliest caimanine; Orthogenysuchus and Tsoabichi are known from the Eocene of North America and Eocaiman is known from the Eocene of South America, indicating that caimanines were dispersing between the continents across large expanses of ocean long before the isthmus formed.

== Description ==
Like many living caimans, Culebrasuchus was small in size. Other caimans that lived during the same time in South America (including those in the genera Mourasuchus and Purussaurus) were much larger than Culebrasuchus. Features that Culebrasuchus shares in common with other caimanines include nostrils that open upward (rather than slightly forward, as in alligatorines), and bones that do not overlap the edges of two openings in the skull table called supratemporal fenestrae. Like living caimanines, Culebrasuchus has blunter teeth at the back of the jaw, and the teeth in the upper jaw completely overly the teeth in the lower jaw when the mouth is closed. Features in Culebrasuchus that are not found in other caimanines include the lack of ridges above the eye sockets and the large size of a hole in the lower jaw called the external mandibular fenestra. These features may be plesiomorphic ("primitive") for alligatorids. Culebrasuchus also has a straighter lower jaw than most other alligatorids, it lacks the ridges on the frontal bone between the eye sockets that are common among crocodylians, and the fourth tooth of the maxilla (rather than third, as in almost all other alligatorids) is the largest in the upper jaw.

== Classification ==
The 2013 study describing and naming Culebrasuchus placed it as the most basal member of the Alligatoridae subfamily Caimanine, and was confirmed by later studies.

The below cladogram is from the initial 2013 study:

- - †Stangerochampsa mccabei
  - - †Brachychampsa montana
    - †Brachychampsa sealeyi
  - Alligatoridae
    - Alligatorinae
    - Caimaninae
      - †Culebrasuchus mesoamericanus
      - - †Eocaiman cavernensis
        - - †Tsoabichi greenriverensis
          - crown group caimans
            - - Paleosuchus palpebrosus Cuvier's dwarf caiman
              - Paleosuchus trigonatus Smooth-fronted caiman
            - - - †Centenariosuchus gilmorei
                - - †Purussaurus neivensis
                  - - †Mourasuchus spp.
                    - †Orthogenysuchus olseni
              - - - Caiman crocodilus Spectacled caiman
                  - Caiman yacare Yacare caiman
                - - Caiman latirostris Broad-snouted caiman
                  - †Caiman lutescens
                  - - †Melanosuchus fisheri
                    - Melanosuchus niger Black caiman

Alternatively, a 2018 study by Bona et al. noted that Culebrasuchus was enigmatic and difficult to interpret, and instead proposed it to be a member of Alligatorinae, closely related to the living American Alligator and Chinese Alligator, as shown in the cladogram below:

- Alligatoridae
  - Caimaninae
  - Alligatorinae
    - Ceratosuchus burdoshi†
    - Allognathosuchus polyodon†
    - Allognathosuchus wartheni†
    - Navajosuchus mooki†
    - Arambourgia gaudryi†
    - - Procaimanoidea kayi†
      - Procaimanoidea utahensis†
    - - Wannaganosuchus brachymanus†
      - - Alligator prenasalis†
        - - Alligator mcgrewi†
          - - Alligator olseni†
            - - Alligator sinensis Chinese alligator
              - - Culebrasuchus mesoamericanus†
                - - Alligator mississippiensis American alligator
                  - Alligator mefferdi†
                  - Alligator thomsoni†

== See also ==
- Centenariosuchus
- Purussaurus
