= Alligator mefferdi =

Alligator mefferdi Temporal range: Miocene, 13.8–10.3 Ma

Scientific classification
- Kingdom: Animalia
- Phylum: Chordata
- Class: Reptilia
- Order: Crocodylia
- Family: Alligatoridae
- Subfamily: Alligatorinae
- Genus: Alligator
- Species: †A. mefferdi

Binomial name
- †Alligator mefferdi C.C. Mook, 1946

Extinct species of alligator

Alligator mefferdi is an extinct species of alligator described by Charles Craig Mook. They lived in the Miocene period, and their range was principally in what is now Nebraska, United States. The type specimen was discovered in the Ash Hollow Formation at Ash Hollow State Historical Park.

== Classification ==
A. mefferdi is a member of the subfamily Alligatorinae, within the larger family Alligatoridae. Phylogenetic studies have found A. mefferdi to be most closely related to the living American alligator, as shown in the cladogram below:

- Alligatoridae
  - Caimaninae
  - Alligatorinae
    - Ceratosuchus burdoshi†
    - Hassiacosuchus haupti†
    - Navajosuchus mooki†
    - - Wannaganosuchus brachymanus†
      - Arambourgia gaudryi†
      - - Allognathosuchus polyodon†
        - Allognathosuchus wartheni†
        - Procaimanoidea kayi†
      - Alligator
        - Alligator prenasalis†
        - - Alligator mcgrewi†
          - - Alligator olseni†
            - - Alligator sinensis Chinese alligator
              - - Alligator thomsoni†
                - Alligator mefferdi†
                - Alligator mississippiensis American alligator

== Measurements ==
The average measurements for the skull of A. mefferdi are 298 x 170 millimeters. Based on the length, the estimated body mass was 34.6 kg.
