= Alligator thomsoni =

Alligator thomsoni Temporal range: Miocene 16–13.6 Ma

Scientific classification
- Kingdom: Animalia
- Phylum: Chordata
- Class: Reptilia
- Clade: Archosauria
- Order: Crocodilia
- Family: Alligatoridae
- Genus: Alligator
- Species: †A. thomsoni

Binomial name
- †Alligator thomsoni Mook, 1923

Extinct species of reptile

Alligator thomsoni is an extinct species of alligator that existed during the Early Miocene period. Their range was principally in what is now known as Nebraska, United States.

== Classification ==
Alligator thomsoni is a member of the subfamily Alligatorinae, within the larger family Alligatoridae. It is closely related to the living American alligator, as shown in the cladogram below:

- Alligatoridae
  - Caimaninae
  - Alligatorinae
    - Ceratosuchus burdoshi†
    - Hassiacosuchus haupti†
    - Navajosuchus mooki†
    - - Wannaganosuchus brachymanus†
      - Arambourgia gaudryi†
      - - Allognathosuchus polyodon†
        - Allognathosuchus wartheni†
        - Procaimanoidea kayi†
      - Alligator
        - Alligator prenasalis†
        - - Alligator mcgrewi†
          - - Alligator olseni†
            - - Alligator sinensis Chinese alligator
              - - Alligator thomsoni†
                - Alligator mefferdi†
                - Alligator mississippiensis American alligator

== Measurements ==
The average measurement for the skull of a A. thomsoni is 363.0 x 223.0 in millimeters. Based on the length, the estimated body mass 67.8 kg.
