= Macroflora =

Macroflora is a term used for all the plants occurring in a particular area that are large enough to be seen with the naked eye. It is usually synonymous with the Flora and can be contrasted with the microflora, a term used for all the bacteria and other microorganisms in an ecosystem.

Macroflora is also an informal term used by many palaeobotanists to refer to an assemblage of plant fossils as preserved in the rock. This is in contrast to the flora, which in this context refers to the assemblage of living plants that were growing in a particular area, whose fragmentary remains became entrapped within the sediment from which the rock was formed and thus became the macroflora.
