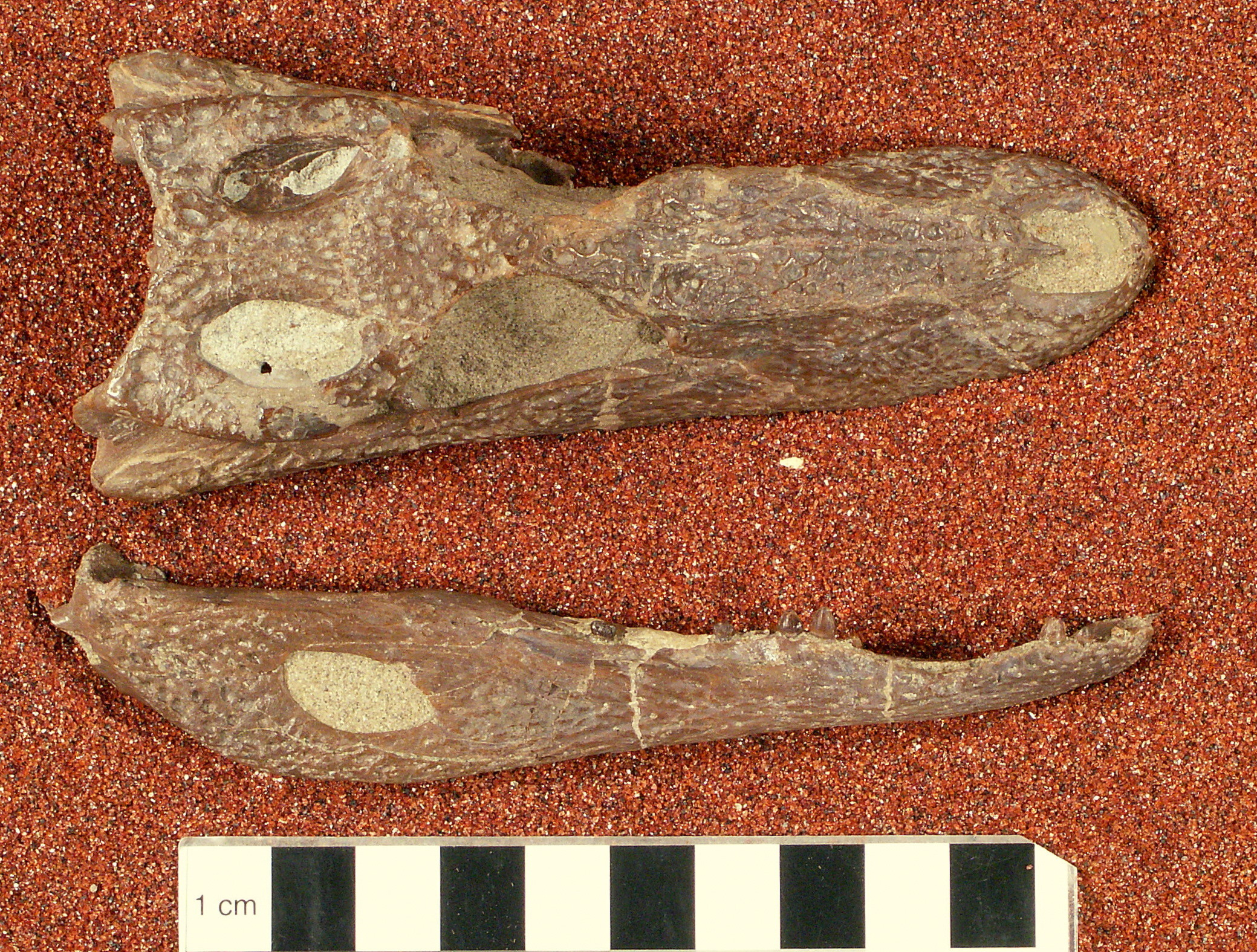
- Fossil specimen of P. utahensis

Scientific classification
- Kingdom: Animalia
- Phylum: Chordata
- Class: Reptilia
- Clade: Archosauria
- Order: Crocodilia
- Superfamily: Alligatoroidea
- Family: Alligatoridae
- Subfamily: Alligatorinae
- Genus: †Procaimanoidea; Gilmore, 1946

Species
- †P. utahensis Gilmore, 1946 (type); †P. kayi (Mook, 1941 [originally Hassiacosuchus kayi])

= Procaimanoidea =

Procaimanoidea Temporal range: Eocene, 46.2–41.2 Ma

Extinct genus of reptiles

Procaimanoidea ("Before Caiman-forms") is an extinct genus of alligatorid from the Eocene of North America. It was named posthumously in 1946 by Charles W. Gilmore; the type species is P. utahensis, from the Uintan (middle Eocene) of Utah. It is based on USNM 15996, a nearly complete skull and partial left hind leg. A second species, P. kayi, was named in 1941 by C.C. Mook as a species of Hassiacosuchus, for remains from the Bridgerian (early Eocene) of Wyoming. It was reassigned to Procaimanoidea in 1967 by Wassersug and Hecht.

== Description ==
Procaimanoidea was a small alligatorid, and slightly heterodont, the last four teeth on each side of the jaws having blunt tips.

== Phylogeny ==
Recent studies have consistently resolved Procaimanoidea as a member of Alligatorinae, although its relative placement is disputed, as shown by the cladograms below.

Cladogram from 2018 Bona et al. study:

- Alligatorinae
  - Ceratosuchus burdoshi†
  - Allognathosuchus polyodon†
  - Allognathosuchus wartheni†
  - Navajosuchus mooki†
  - Arambourgia gaudryi†
  - - Procaimanoidea kayi†
    - Procaimanoidea utahensis†
  - - Wannaganosuchus brachymanus†
    - - Alligator prenasalis†
      - - Alligator mcgrewi†
        - - Alligator olseni†
          - - Alligator sinensis Chinese alligator
            - - Culebrasuchus mesoamericanus†
              - - Alligator mississippiensis American alligator
                - Alligator mefferdi†
                - Alligator thomsoni†

Cladogram from 2019 Massonne et al. study:

- Alligatorinae
  - - Alligator prenasalis†
    - Alligator mcgrewi†
  - - - Alligator olseni†
      - - Alligator sinensis Chinese alligator
        - - Alligator thomsoni†
          - Alligator mefferdi†
          - Alligator mississippiensis American alligator
    - - - Procaimanoidea utahensis†
        - Procaimanoidea kayi†
      - - Arambourgia gaudryi†
        - - Hassiacosuchus haupti†
          - - Wannaganosuchus brachymanus†
            - - Allognathosuchus wartheni†
              - Allognathosuchus polyodon†

Cladogram from 2020 Cossette & Brochu study:

- Alligatorinae
  - Ceratosuchus burdoshi†
  - Hassiacosuchus haupti†
  - Navajosuchus mooki†
  - - Allognathosuchus polyodon†
    - - Alligator mcgrewi†
      - Alligator prenasalis†
    - - Wannaganosuchus brachymanus†
      - - - Arambourgia gaudryi†
          - - Procaimanoidea kayi†
            - Procaimanoidea utahensis†
        - - Alligator olseni†
          - - Alligator sinensis Chinese alligator
            - - Alligator mississippiensis American alligator
              - Alligator mefferdi†
              - Alligator thomsoni†
