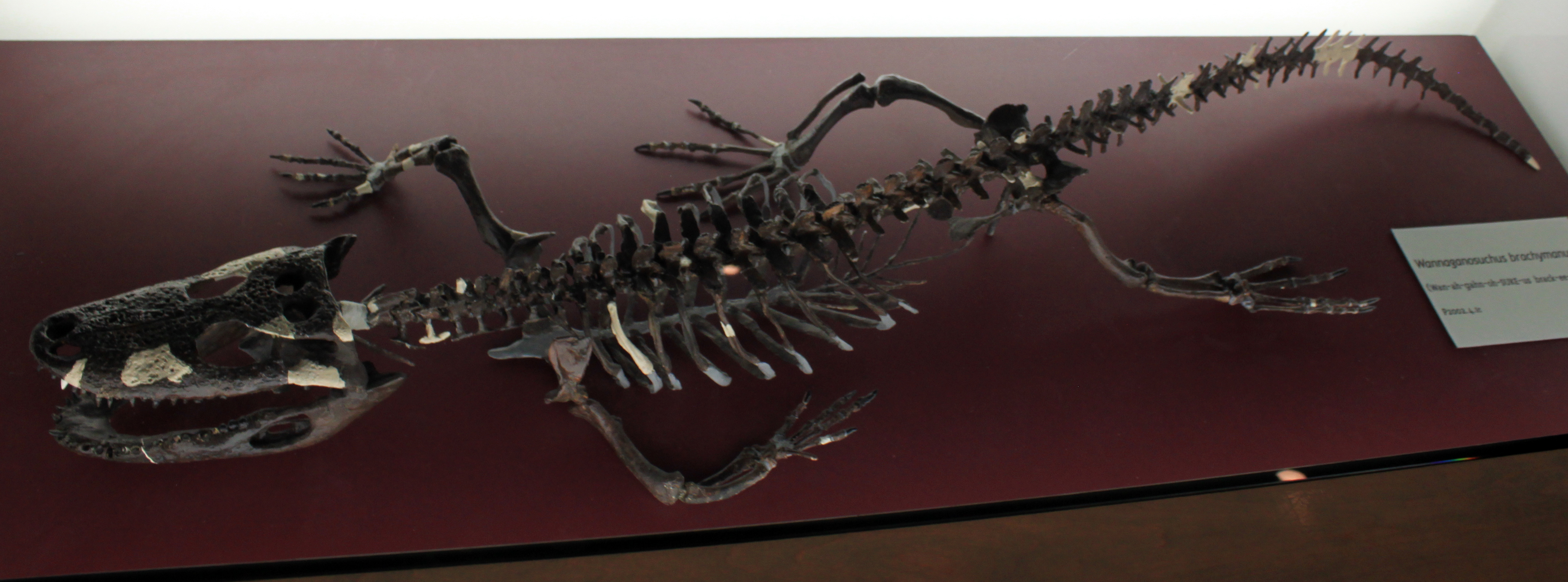
- Fossil of Wannaganosuchus brachymanus

Scientific classification
- Kingdom: Animalia
- Phylum: Chordata
- Class: Reptilia
- Clade: Archosauria
- Order: Crocodilia
- Superfamily: Alligatoroidea
- Family: Alligatoridae
- Subfamily: Alligatorinae
- Genus: †Wannaganosuchus; Erickson, 1982

Type species
- †Wannaganosuchus brachymanus Erickson, 1982

= Wannaganosuchus =

Wannaganosuchus Temporal range: Late Paleocene, 61.6–56 Ma

Extinct genus of reptiles

Wannaganosuchus (meaning "Wannagan crocodile", in reference to the Wannagan Creek site where it was discovered) is an extinct genus of small alligatorid crocodilian. It was found in Late Paleocene-age rocks of Billings County, North Dakota, United States.

== History and description ==
Wannaganosuchus is based on SMM P76.28.247, a mostly complete skull and postcranial skeleton missing some vertebrae, coracoids, part of the feet, ribs, and other pieces. A few small bony scutes are also assigned to the genus, but not to the type specimen. SMM P76.28.247 was found semi-articulated in the lower part of the Bullion Creek Formation, near the base of a lignitic clay layer deposited in a marsh setting on a floodplain. Wannaganosuchus was named in 1982 by Bruce R. Erickson. The type species is W. brachymanus; the specific name means "short forefoot".

The skull of SMM P76.28.247 was low, without elevated rims over the eyes, and was 159 millimetres (6.3 in) long. The snout was short and pointed compared to Cretaceous alligatorids. Its premaxillae (the bones of the tip of the snout) had five teeth each, while the maxillae (main tooth-bearing bones of the upper jaw) had thirteen teeth each, with the fourth being the largest and the last three having broad flattened crowns. The lower jaws had twenty teeth on each side, and like the upper jaws, the last five had broad crushing crowns. The forelimbs were short (hence the specific name), and the hindlimbs were long in comparison. The scutes were extensive. Most of the scutes were keeled, but did not have spikes.

Erickson regarded Wannaganosuchus as a generalized early alligatorid closer to the line leading to modern alligatorids than other more specialized early alligatorids. It may be the same as Allognathosuchus.

== Paleoecology and paleobiology ==
Wannaganosuchus was found in a layer with abundant plant fossils suggesting the presence of a swamp forest in the area; taxodioid logs are common. The deposit was formed under 2 to 3 metres (6.6 to 9.8 ft) of water, and grades into a shoreline deposit about 20 metres (66 ft) away. Lilies and water ferns grew along the shore and were shaded by cypress trees.

SMM P76.28.247 was found in direct association with skeletons of Borealosuchus formidabilis and the long-snouted champsosaur Champsosaurus. These three taxa probably occupied different ecological niches based on size and morphology. Wannaganosuchus was a small alligatorid, only about 1.00 metre (3.28 ft) long as an adult, much smaller than its more abundant distant relative from the same quarry, Borealosuchus (roughly 4 metres (13 ft) long). Borealosuchus would have dominated the beach zone, while Champsosaurus is interpreted as a piscivore that swam near the bottom. Wannaganosuchus is thought to have lived like the modern caiman Paleosuchus, preferring seclusion. It may have floated among clumps of water plants. The structure of the arms, legs, and tail suggest that it was more aquatic than terrestrial. The mix of tooth shapes indicate it could eat a variety of foods.

== Phylogeny ==
Recent studies have consistently resolved Wannaganosuchus as a member of Alligatorinae, although its relative placement is disputed, as shown by the cladograms below.

Cladogram from 2018 Bona et al. study:

- Alligatorinae
  - Ceratosuchus burdoshi†
  - Allognathosuchus polyodon†
  - Allognathosuchus wartheni†
  - Navajosuchus mooki†
  - Arambourgia gaudryi†
  - - Procaimanoidea kayi†
    - Procaimanoidea utahensis†
  - - Wannaganosuchus brachymanus†
    - - Alligator prenasalis†
      - - Alligator mcgrewi†
        - - Alligator olseni†
          - - Alligator sinensis Chinese alligator
            - - Culebrasuchus mesoamericanus†
              - - Alligator mississippiensis American alligator
                - Alligator mefferdi†
                - Alligator thomsoni†

Cladogram from 2019 Massonne et al. study:

- Alligatorinae
  - - Alligator prenasalis†
    - Alligator mcgrewi†
  - - - Alligator olseni†
      - - Alligator sinensis Chinese alligator
        - - Alligator thomsoni†
          - Alligator mefferdi†
          - Alligator mississippiensis American alligator
    - - - Procaimanoidea utahensis†
        - Procaimanoidea kayi†
      - - Arambourgia gaudryi†
        - - Hassiacosuchus haupti†
          - - Wannaganosuchus brachymanus†
            - - Allognathosuchus wartheni†
              - Allognathosuchus polyodon†

Cladogram from 2020 Cossette & Brochu study:

- Alligatorinae
  - Ceratosuchus burdoshi†
  - Hassiacosuchus haupti†
  - Navajosuchus mooki†
  - - Allognathosuchus polyodon†
    - - Alligator mcgrewi†
      - Alligator prenasalis†
    - - Wannaganosuchus brachymanus†
      - - - Arambourgia gaudryi†
          - - Procaimanoidea kayi†
            - Procaimanoidea utahensis†
        - - Alligator olseni†
          - - Alligator sinensis Chinese alligator
            - - Alligator mississippiensis American alligator
              - Alligator mefferdi†
              - Alligator thomsoni†
