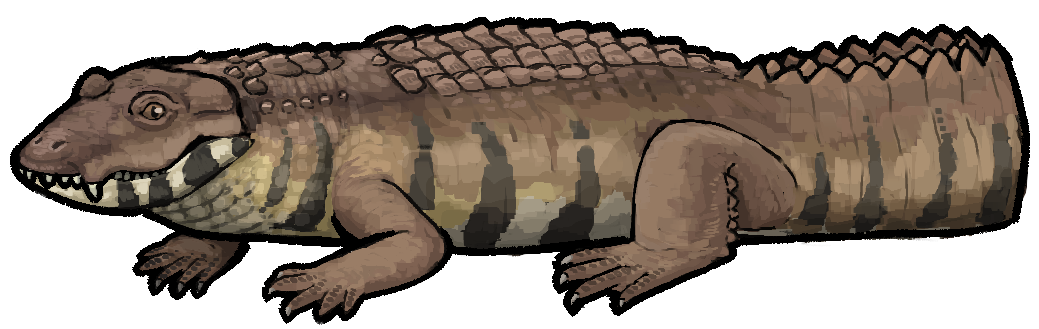
- Restoration of Arambourgia

Scientific classification
- Kingdom: Animalia
- Phylum: Chordata
- Class: Reptilia
- Clade: Archosauria
- Order: Crocodilia
- Family: Alligatoridae
- Subfamily: Alligatorinae
- Genus: †Arambourgia; Kälin, 1940

Type species
- †Alligator gaudryi de Stefano, 1905

= Arambourgia =

Arambourgia Temporal range: Late Eocene, 37.8–33.9 Ma

Extinct genus of reptiles

Arambourgia is an extinct monotypic genus of alligatorine crocodylian from Europe. It was named in 1905 as Alligator gaudryi. It was made a separate genus Arambourgia in 1940. This was synonymized with Allognathosuchus haupti in 1990 (now known as Hassiacosuchus haupti), but later reassigned as its own genus once again in 2004. Arambourgia was likely to have been part of an early dispersal event of alligatorines from North America to Europe during the Eocene epoch. Arambourgia had non-serrated teeth and a deep orienirostral snout, unlike the flatter snouts of most other alligatorids.

Recent studies have consistently resolved Arambourgia as a member of Alligatorinae, although its relative placement is disputed, as shown by the cladograms below.

Cladogram from 2018 Bona et al. study:

- Alligatorinae
  - Ceratosuchus burdoshi†
  - Allognathosuchus polyodon†
  - Allognathosuchus wartheni†
  - Navajosuchus mooki†
  - Arambourgia gaudryi†
  - - Procaimanoidea kayi†
    - Procaimanoidea utahensis†
  - - Wannaganosuchus brachymanus†
    - - Alligator prenasalis†
      - - Alligator mcgrewi†
        - - Alligator olseni†
          - - Alligator sinensis Chinese alligator
            - - Culebrasuchus mesoamericanus†
              - - Alligator mississippiensis American alligator
                - Alligator mefferdi†
                - Alligator thomsoni†

Cladogram from 2019 Massonne et al. study:

- Alligatorinae
  - - Alligator prenasalis†
    - Alligator mcgrewi†
  - - - Alligator olseni†
      - - Alligator sinensis Chinese alligator
        - - Alligator thomsoni†
          - Alligator mefferdi†
          - Alligator mississippiensis American alligator
    - - - Procaimanoidea utahensis†
        - Procaimanoidea kayi†
      - - Arambourgia gaudryi†
        - - Hassiacosuchus haupti†
          - - Wannaganosuchus brachymanus†
            - - Allognathosuchus wartheni†
              - Allognathosuchus polyodon†

Cladogram from 2020 Cossette & Brochu study:

- Alligatorinae
  - Ceratosuchus burdoshi†
  - Hassiacosuchus haupti†
  - Navajosuchus mooki†
  - - Allognathosuchus polyodon†
    - - Alligator mcgrewi†
      - Alligator prenasalis†
    - - Wannaganosuchus brachymanus†
      - - - Arambourgia gaudryi†
          - - Procaimanoidea kayi†
            - Procaimanoidea utahensis†
        - - Alligator olseni†
          - - Alligator sinensis Chinese alligator
            - - Alligator mississippiensis American alligator
              - Alligator mefferdi†
              - Alligator thomsoni†

== Palaeoecology ==
Based on its unusual anatomy and it having been found in karstic settings, A. gaudryi occupied an ecological niche analogous to present-day juvenile and dwarf crocodylians.
