= Alligator mcgrewi =

Alligator mcgrewi Temporal range: Early Miocene 20.43–15.97 Ma

Scientific classification
- Kingdom: Animalia
- Phylum: Chordata
- Class: Reptilia
- Clade: Archosauria
- Order: Crocodilia
- Family: Alligatoridae
- Subfamily: Alligatorinae
- Genus: Alligator
- Species: †A. mcgrewi

Binomial name
- †Alligator mcgrewi Schmidt, 1941

Extinct species of reptile

Alligator mcgrewi is an extinct species of alligator described by K.P. Schmidt in 1941. They lived in the Early Miocene period, and their range was principally in what is now Nebraska, United States. It is a small alligator with an estimated body length of 1.6 metres (5.2 ft). A. mcgrewi has a unique snout, distinguishing it from other alligator species and implying that it evolved from specific environmental adaptations.

== Classification ==
Alligator mcgrewi is a member of the subfamily Alligatorinae, within the larger family Alligatoridae. It is related to the living American alligator and Chinese alligator, as shown in the cladogram below:

- Alligatoridae
  - Caimaninae
  - Alligatorinae
    - Ceratosuchus burdoshi†
    - Hassiacosuchus haupti†
    - Navajosuchus mooki†
    - - Wannaganosuchus brachymanus†
      - Arambourgia gaudryi†
      - - Allognathosuchus polyodon†
        - Allognathosuchus wartheni†
        - Procaimanoidea kayi†
      - Alligator
        - Alligator prenasalis†
        - - Alligator mcgrewi†
          - - Alligator olseni†
            - - Alligator sinensis Chinese alligator
              - - Alligator thomsoni†
                - Alligator mefferdi†
                - Alligator mississippiensis American alligator
