= Batrachosauroides =

Batrachosauroides Temporal range: 55.8–13.6 Ma

Scientific classification
- Kingdom: Animalia
- Phylum: Chordata
- Class: Amphibia
- Family: †Batrachosauroididae
- Genus: †Batrachosauroides; Taylor and Hesse, 1943

Extinct genus of salamanders

Batrachosauroides is an extinct genus of prehistoric salamander known from several sites across the United States. The two identified species are Batrachosauroides dissimulans (Taylor and Hesse, 1945) and Batrachosauroides gotoi (Estes, 1969). A proposed, unidentified third species has been proposed by paleontologist James Gardner based on the discovery of a dental fossil in the Bushy Tailed Blowout area of the Lance Formation fossil grounds, but has not been definitively identified as a new species or as part of either of the two identified species.

== See also ==
- List of prehistoric amphibians
