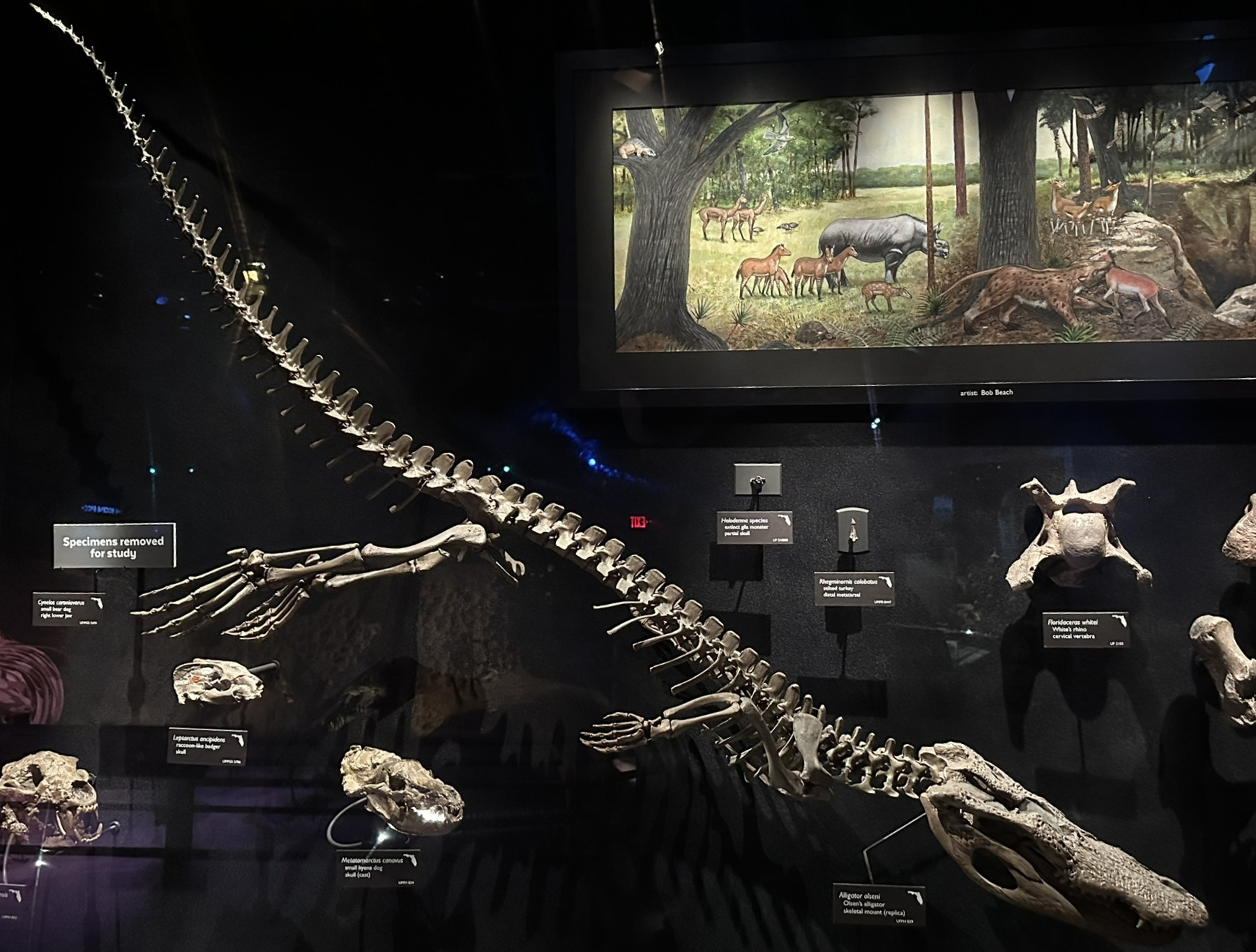
- Reconstructed skeleton cast, Florida Museum of Natural History

Scientific classification
- Kingdom: Animalia
- Phylum: Chordata
- Class: Reptilia
- Clade: Archosauria
- Order: Crocodilia
- Family: Alligatoridae
- Subfamily: Alligatorinae
- Genus: Alligator
- Species: †A. olseni

Binomial name
- †Alligator olseni White, 1942

= Alligator olseni =

Olsen's alligator Temporal range: Early Miocene 20.4–16 Ma

Extinct species of reptile

Alligator olseni (common name Olsen's Alligator, named after Russel Olsen) is an extinct species of alligator. They lived in the Early Miocene period, around 20.4–15.97 million years ago and possibly earlier. Their range was principally in what is now known as Florida, United States, and possibly extending into southeastern Texas. It is a small alligator with an estimated body length of 2.6 metres (8.5 ft).

== Classification ==
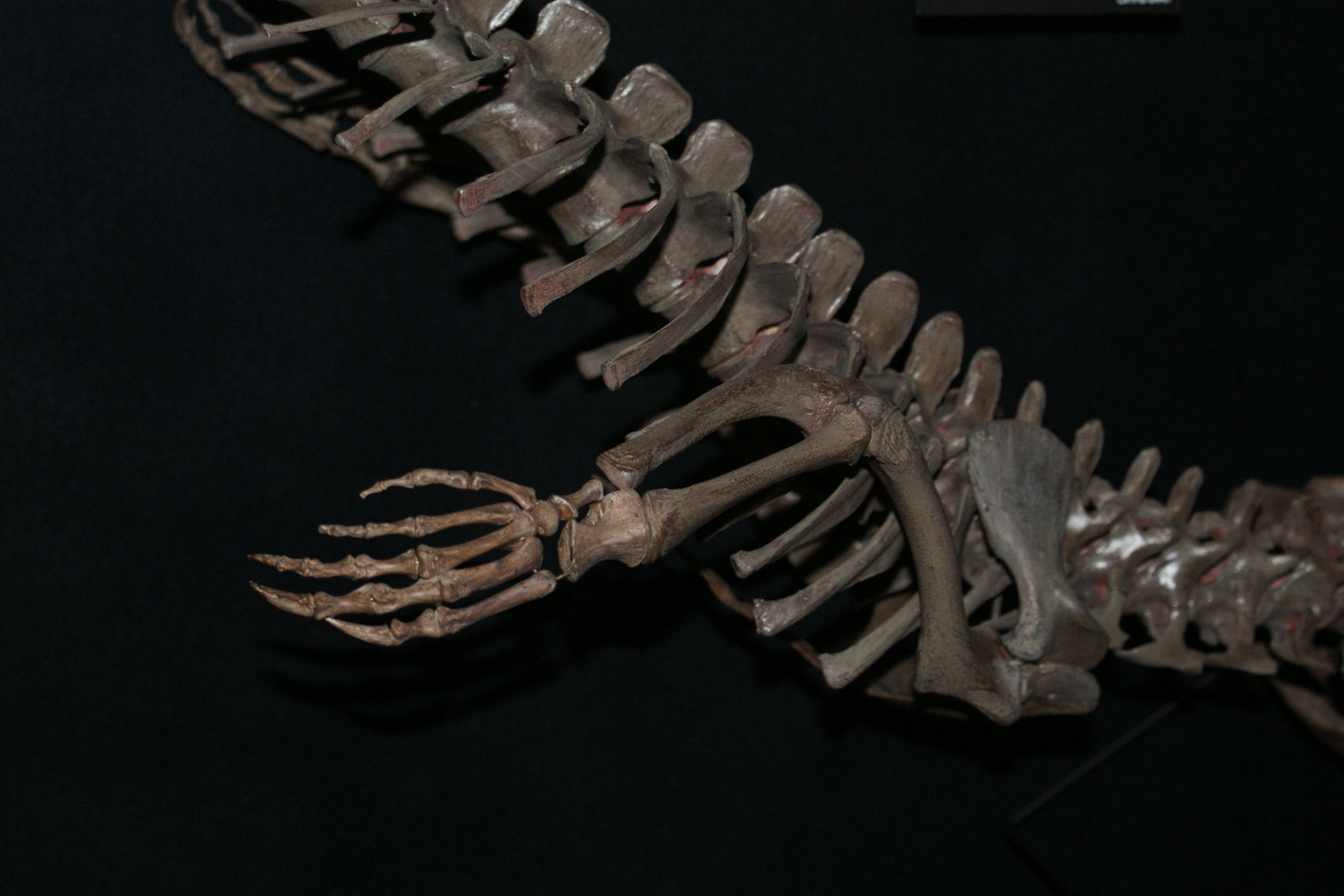
Closeup of forelimbs

Alligator olseni is a member of the subfamily Alligatorinae, within the larger family Alligatoridae. It is closely related to the living American alligator and Chinese alligator, as shown in the cladogram below:

- Alligatoridae
  - Caimaninae
  - Alligatorinae
    - Ceratosuchus burdoshi†
    - Hassiacosuchus haupti†
    - Navajosuchus mooki†
    - - Wannaganosuchus brachymanus†
      - Arambourgia gaudryi†
      - - Allognathosuchus polyodon†
        - Allognathosuchus wartheni†
        - Procaimanoidea kayi†
      - Alligator
        - Alligator prenasalis†
        - - Alligator mcgrewi†
          - - Alligator olseni†
            - - Alligator sinensis Chinese alligator
              - - Alligator thomsoni†
                - Alligator mefferdi†
                - Alligator mississippiensis American alligator
