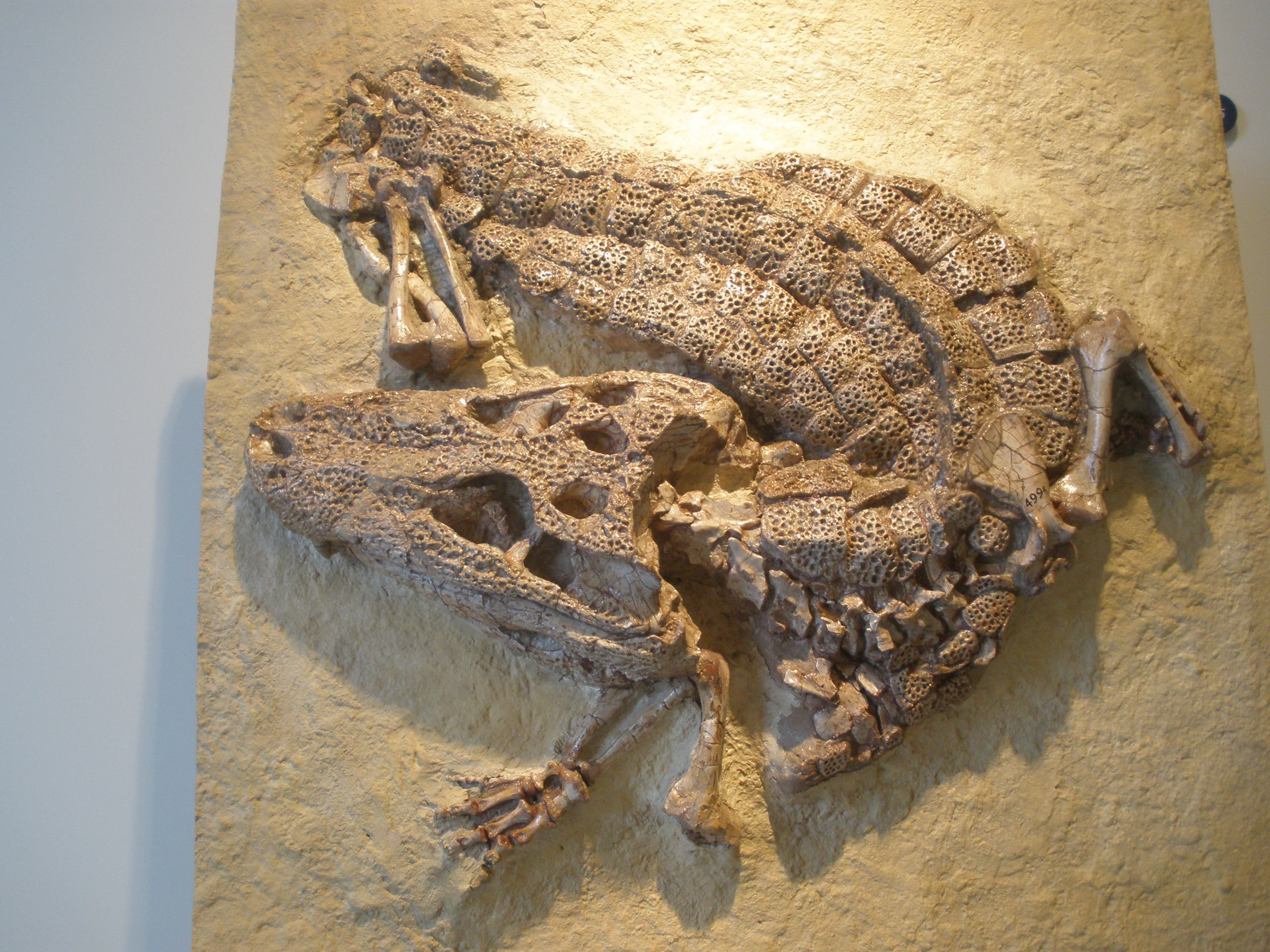
- Skeleton of Alligator prenasalis (AMNH 4994) in the American Museum of Natural History

Scientific classification
- Kingdom: Animalia
- Phylum: Chordata
- Class: Reptilia
- Order: Crocodylia
- Family: Alligatoridae
- Genus: Alligator
- Species: †A. prenasalis

Binomial name
- †Alligator prenasalis (Loomis, 1904)

Synonyms
- Crododilus prenasalis Loomis, 1904; Caimanoidea visheri Mehl, 1916; Caimanoideus visheri Mehl, 1916 (lapsus calami of Caimanoidea visheri); Caimanoeda visheri Mehl, 1916 (lapsus calami of Caimanoidea visheri); Allognathosuchus riggsi Patterson, 1931

= Alligator prenasalis =

Alligator prenasalis Temporal range: Late Eocene, 37.2–33.9 Ma

Extinct species of reptile

Alligator prenasalis is an extinct species of alligator from the Late Eocene period. It is well known, with many fossils having been collected from the Chadron and Brule Formations in South Dakota. The species was first named in 1904, but was originally classified as a crocodile in the genus Crocodilus. It was reassigned to the genus Alligator in 1918 on the basis of more complete material. It is the earliest known member of the genus Alligator.

== Taxonomy ==
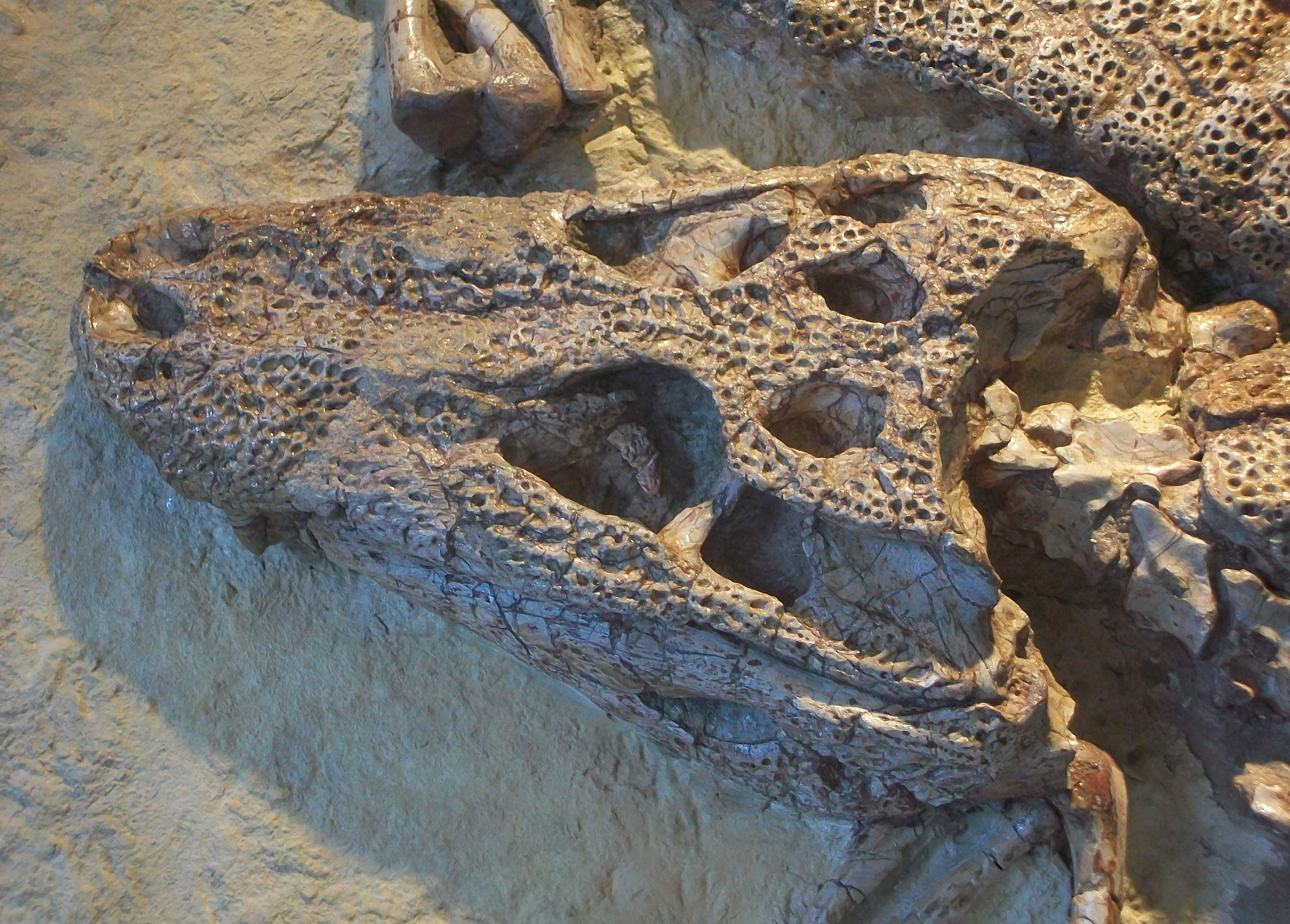
The skull of Alligator prenasalis (AMNH 4994)

=== Junior synonyms ===
Several species of extinct alligatorines have been considered junior synonyms of A. prenasalis. These include Caimanoidea visheri, named by paleontologist Maurice Mehl in 1916 from fragmentary material, and Allognathosuchus riggsi, named in 1931 from a single piece of a lower jaw. Both were considered synonymous with the species in 1972 by paleontologist D.W. Higgins. Mehl used two alternate spellings of Caimanoidea in his 1916 paper: Caimanoideus and Caimanoeda. Because the name Caimanoidea is used first and most frequently, it has been considered the valid name of the genus.

=== Cladistics ===
A. prenasalis is similar to the Eocene alligatorine Allognathosuchus mooki (now known as Navajosuchus mooki). In 1930, American paleontologist George Gaylord Simpson considered A. prenasalis (then called Caimanoidea) to be ancestral to A. mooki because it appeared to be similar but less specialized. A. mooki was considered to be more specialized because it had a blunt snout, while A. prenasalis had a broader, flat, and supposedly primitive snout.

If A. prenasalis were an ancestor of A. mooki, it would have to have occurred in the Eocene. Simpson hypothesized that A. prenasalis appeared at this time and gave rise to A. mooki, which soon became extinct. While A. prenasalis (a more generalized form) possibly could have descended from A. mooki (a more specialized form) through what is known as a reversal, the accepted knowledge at the time was that generalists could not arise from specialists. This was called the "law of the unspecialized", first devised by paleontologist Edward Drinker Cope in 1896.

More recent phylogenetic analyses have shown flat-snouted alligatorines to form a clade within a larger group of blunt-snouted alligatorines. Therefore, blunt-snouted forms did not form a single, specialized group, but rather a collection of basal taxa, some of which were ancestral to modern forms such as Alligator. Alligator is usually recovered as a monophyletic group with A. prenasalis as the most basal member of the clade, as shown in the cladogram below:

- Alligatoridae
  - Caimaninae
  - Alligatorinae
    - Ceratosuchus burdoshi†
    - Hassiacosuchus haupti†
    - Navajosuchus mooki†
    - - Wannaganosuchus brachymanus†
      - Arambourgia gaudryi†
      - - Allognathosuchus polyodon†
        - Allognathosuchus wartheni†
        - Procaimanoidea kayi†
      - Alligator
        - Alligator prenasalis†
        - - Alligator mcgrewi†
          - - Alligator olseni†
            - - Alligator sinensis Chinese alligator
              - - Alligator thomsoni†
                - Alligator mefferdi†
                - Alligator mississippiensis American alligator
