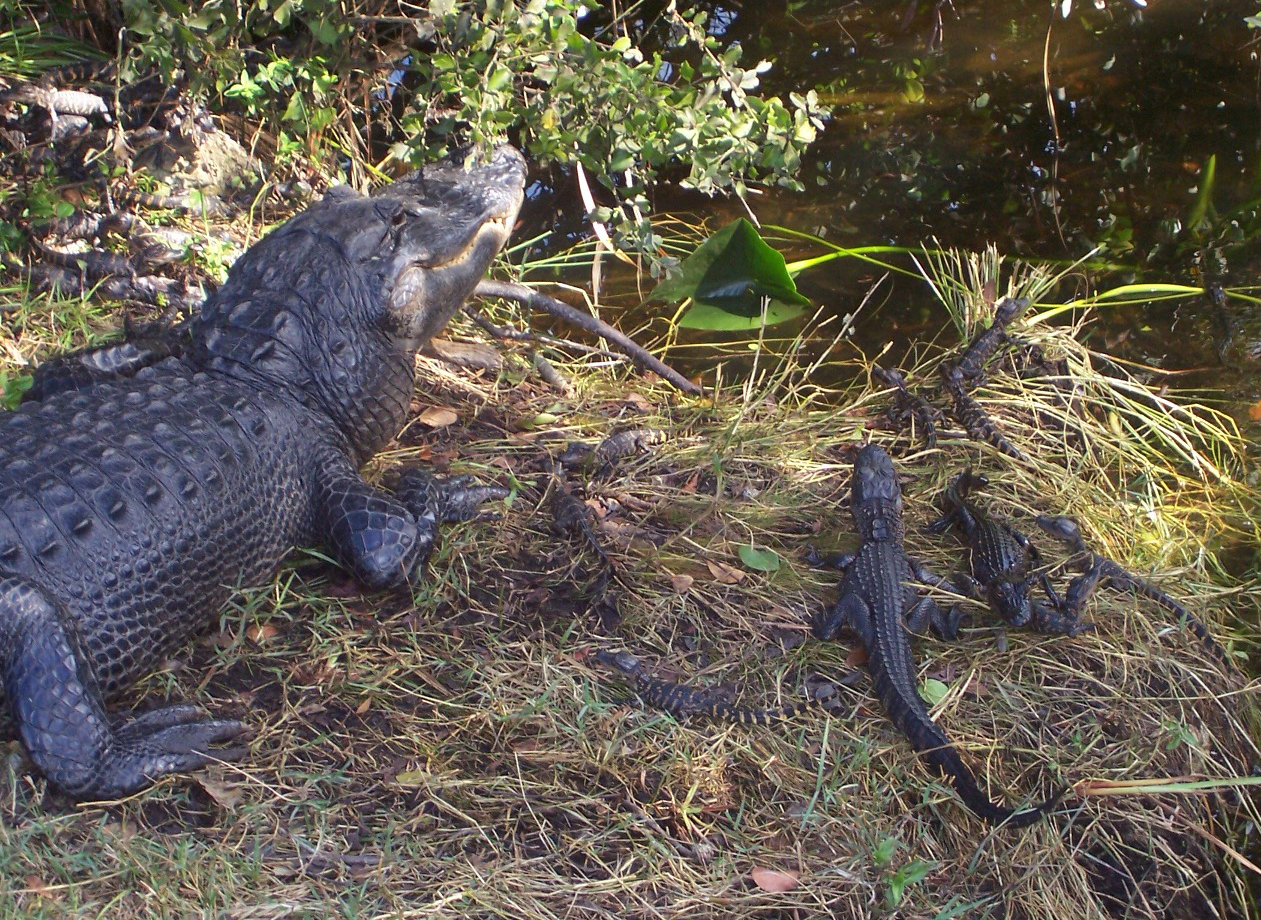

Scientific classification
- Kingdom: Animalia
- Phylum: Chordata
- Class: Reptilia
- Order: Crocodylia
- Family: Alligatoridae
- Subfamily: Alligatorinae; Gray, 1844

Genera
- Alligator; †Ahdeskatanka; †Allognathosuchus; †Arambourgia; †Ceratosuchus; †Hassiacosuchus; †Mandrasuchus; †Navajosuchus?; †Procaimanoidea; †Wannaganosuchus

= Alligatorinae =

Alligatorinae Temporal range: Paleocene–Present Possible Maastrichtian origin if Late Cretaceous taxa are included

Subfamily of reptiles

Alligatorinae is a subfamily within the family Alligatoridae that contains the alligators and their closest extinct relatives, and is the sister taxon to Caimaninae (the caimans). Many genera in Alligatorinae are described, but only the genus Alligator is extant, with the remaining being extinct.

== Evolution ==
Alligators and caimans split in North America during the early Tertiary or late Cretaceous (about 53 million to about 65 million years ago). The oldest named alligatorine, Mandrasuchus, is known from the earliest Paleocene (close to the Cretaceous–Paleogene boundary) of Colorado, United States. The extant Chinese alligator split from the American alligator about 33 million years ago and likely descended from a lineage that crossed the Bering land bridge during the Neogene. The modern American alligator is well represented in the fossil record of the Pleistocene. The alligator's full mitochondrial genome was sequenced in the 1990s. The full genome, published in 2014, suggests that the alligator evolved much more slowly than mammals and birds.

== Phylogeny ==
Alligatorinae is cladistically defined as Alligator mississippiensis (the American alligator) and all species closer to it than to Caiman crocodylus (the spectacled caiman). This is a stem-based definition for Alligatorinae, and means that it includes more basal extinct alligator ancestors that are more closely related to living alligators than to caimans.

The below cladogram shows the phylogeny of Alligatorinae.

- Alligatoridae
  - Caimaninae
  - Alligatorinae
    - †Ceratosuchus burdoshi
    - †Hassiacosuchus haupti
    - †Navajosuchus mooki
    - - †Wannaganosuchus brachymanus
      - †Arambourgia gaudryi
      - - †Allognathosuchus polyodon
        - †Allognathosuchus wartheni
        - †Procaimanoidea kayi
      - Alligator
        - †Alligator prenasalis
        - - †Alligator mcgrewi
          - - †Alligator olseni
            - - Alligator sinensis (Chinese alligator)
              - - †Alligator thomsoni
                - †Alligator mefferdi
                - Alligator mississippiensis (American alligator)
