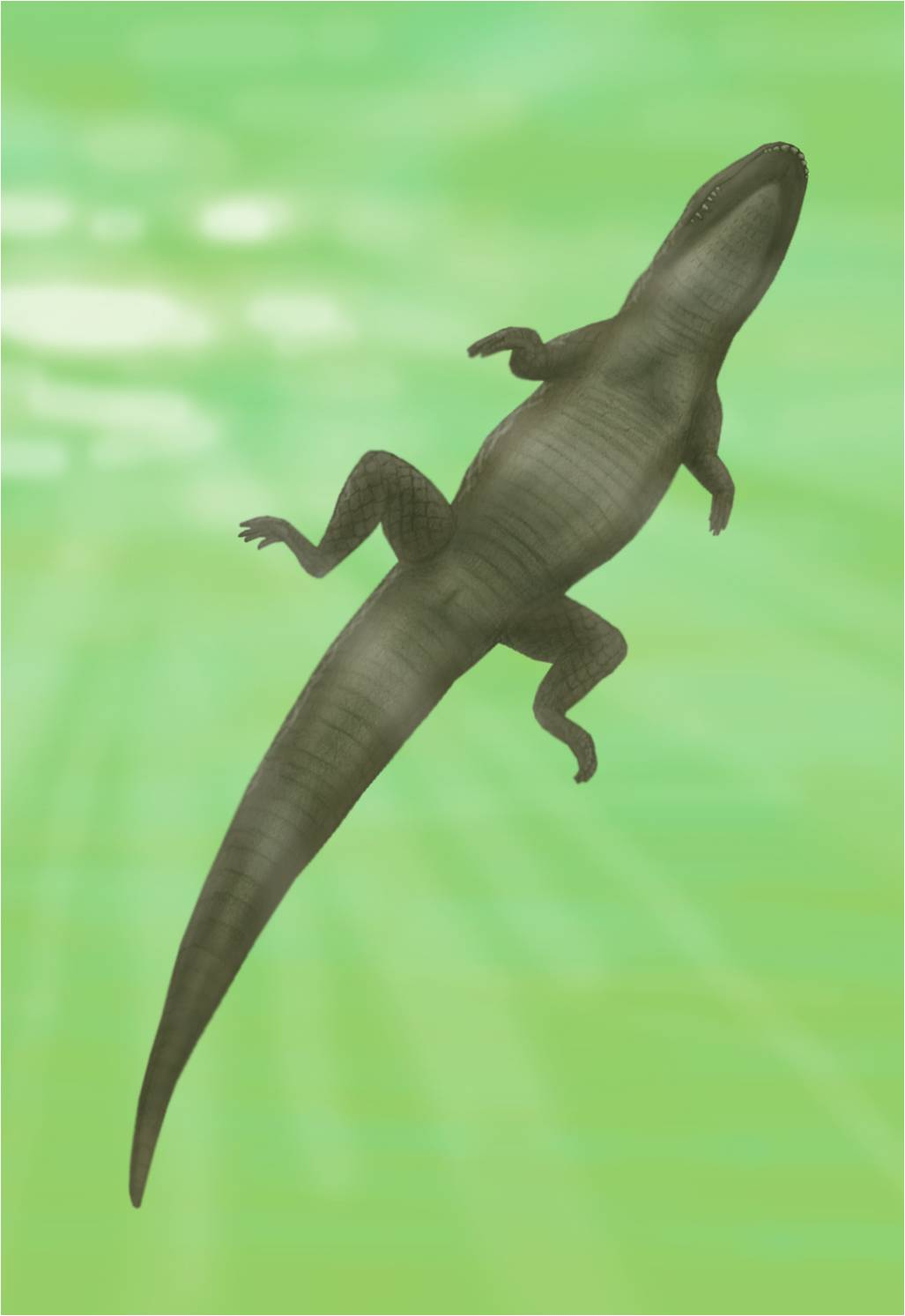
- Life restoration of Allognathosuchus gracilis

Scientific classification
- Kingdom: Animalia
- Phylum: Chordata
- Class: Reptilia
- Clade: Archosauria
- Order: Crocodilia
- Superfamily: Alligatoroidea
- Family: Alligatoridae
- Subfamily: Alligatorinae
- Genus: †Allognathosuchus; Mook, 1921

Species
- †A. polyodon (Cope, 1872 [originally Crocodylus polyodon]) (type); †?A. gracilis Rauhe and Rossmann, 1995; †A. heterodon (Cope, 1872 [originally Alligator heterodon]); †?A. wartheni Case, 1925; †?A. woutersi Buffetaut, 1985

= Allognathosuchus =

Allognathosuchus Temporal range: Eocene, 56–47.8 Ma

Extinct genus of reptiles

Allognathosuchus (meaning "other jaw crocodile") is an extinct genus of alligatorine crocodylian with a complicated taxonomic history. It was named in 1921.

== Description ==
Allognathosuchus was a medium-sized predator up to 1.5 m in length. This alligatorine is known for its stout jaws and bulbous teeth, found near the rear of the tooth row in upper and lower jaws. These adaptations have historically been interpreted as having been for crushing mollusks. Isolated bulbous teeth are often assigned to this genus, although such teeth are known from other crocodyliform lineages.

== Taxonomy ==
The type species, A. polyodon, is from the Eocene-age Bridger Formation of Wyoming; it is based on fossils that are difficult to distinguish from other Paleogene alligatorids. A. heterodon is from the Eocene-age Wasatch Formation of Wyoming, A. wartheni is from the Eocene-age Wildwood Formation (also known as the "Wildwood alligatorid" and possibly two species), and A. woutersi, which may belong to Diplocynodon, instead, is from the Early Eocene of Belgium. A. polyodon, A. heterodon, and A. wartheni span the Clarkforkian, Wasatchian, and Bridgerian North American Land Mammal Ages.

Several other genera and species were previously assigned to Allognathosuchus, giving it a potential Upper Cretaceous-Oligocene stratigraphic range, and a geographic range covering North America, Europe, and Africa. Christopher Brochu reviewed the genus in 2004, and in light of the fragmentary remains of several of the species involved, recommended conservative use of the genus. He excluded Albertochampsa langstoni, Arambourgia gaudryi, and Wannaganosuchus brachymanus from Allognathosuchus, and resurrected Hassiacosuchus and Navajosuchus from synonymy with Allognathosuchus after finding them not to group with A. polyodon to the exclusion of other alligatorines.

Recent studies have consistently resolved Allognathosuchus polyodon and Allognathosuchus wartheni as members of Alligatorinae, although their relative placement is disputed, as shown by the cladograms below.

Cladogram from 2018 Bona et al. study:

- Alligatorinae
  - Ceratosuchus burdoshi†
  - Allognathosuchus polyodon†
  - Allognathosuchus wartheni†
  - Navajosuchus mooki†
  - Arambourgia gaudryi†
  - - Procaimanoidea kayi†
    - Procaimanoidea utahensis†
  - - Wannaganosuchus brachymanus†
    - - Alligator prenasalis†
      - - Alligator mcgrewi†
        - - Alligator olseni†
          - - Alligator sinensis Chinese alligator
            - - Culebrasuchus mesoamericanus†
              - - Alligator mississippiensis American alligator
                - Alligator mefferdi†
                - Alligator thomsoni†

Cladogram from 2019 Massonne et al. study:

- Alligatorinae
  - - Alligator prenasalis†
    - Alligator mcgrewi†
  - - - Alligator olseni†
      - - Alligator sinensis Chinese alligator
        - - Alligator thomsoni†
          - Alligator mefferdi†
          - Alligator mississippiensis American alligator
    - - - Procaimanoidea utahensis†
        - Procaimanoidea kayi†
      - - Arambourgia gaudryi†
        - - Hassiacosuchus haupti†
          - - Wannaganosuchus brachymanus†
            - - Allognathosuchus wartheni†
              - Allognathosuchus polyodon†

Cladogram from 2020 Cossette & Brochu study:

- Alligatorinae
  - Ceratosuchus burdoshi†
  - Hassiacosuchus haupti†
  - Navajosuchus mooki†
  - - Allognathosuchus polyodon†
    - - Alligator mcgrewi†
      - Alligator prenasalis†
    - - Wannaganosuchus brachymanus†
      - - - Arambourgia gaudryi†
          - - Procaimanoidea kayi†
            - Procaimanoidea utahensis†
        - - Alligator olseni†
          - - Alligator sinensis Chinese alligator
            - - Alligator mississippiensis American alligator
              - Alligator mefferdi†
              - Alligator thomsoni†
