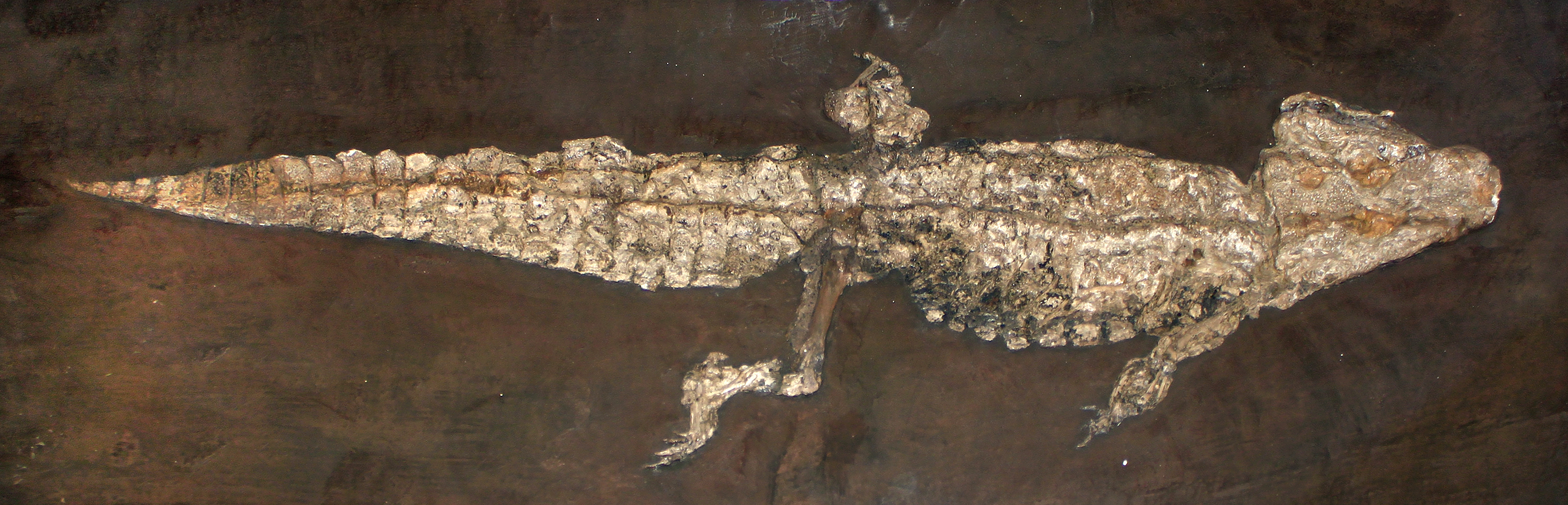
- Fossil, State Museum of Natural History Karlsruhe

Scientific classification
- Kingdom: Animalia
- Phylum: Chordata
- Class: Reptilia
- Clade: Archosauria
- Order: Crocodilia
- Superfamily: Alligatoroidea
- Family: Alligatoridae
- Subfamily: Alligatorinae
- Genus: †Hassiacosuchus; Weitzel, 1935

Type species
- †Hassiacosuchus haupti Weitzel, 1935

= Hassiacosuchus =

Hassiacosuchus Temporal range: Eocene, 47.8–41.2 Ma

Extinct genus of reptiles

Hassiacosuchus is an extinct genus of small alligatorid from the early Eocene of Germany, found at the Messel pit. It was named in 1935 by K. Weitzel, and the type species is H. haupti. A second species, H. kayi, was named in 1941 by C.C. Mook for material from the Bridgerian (early Eocene) of Wyoming, but was reassigned to Procaimanoidea in 1967 by Wassersug and Hecht, who also argued that Hassiacosuchus is synonymous with Allognathosuchus. Phylogenetic analyses exclude H. haupti from Allognathosuchus.

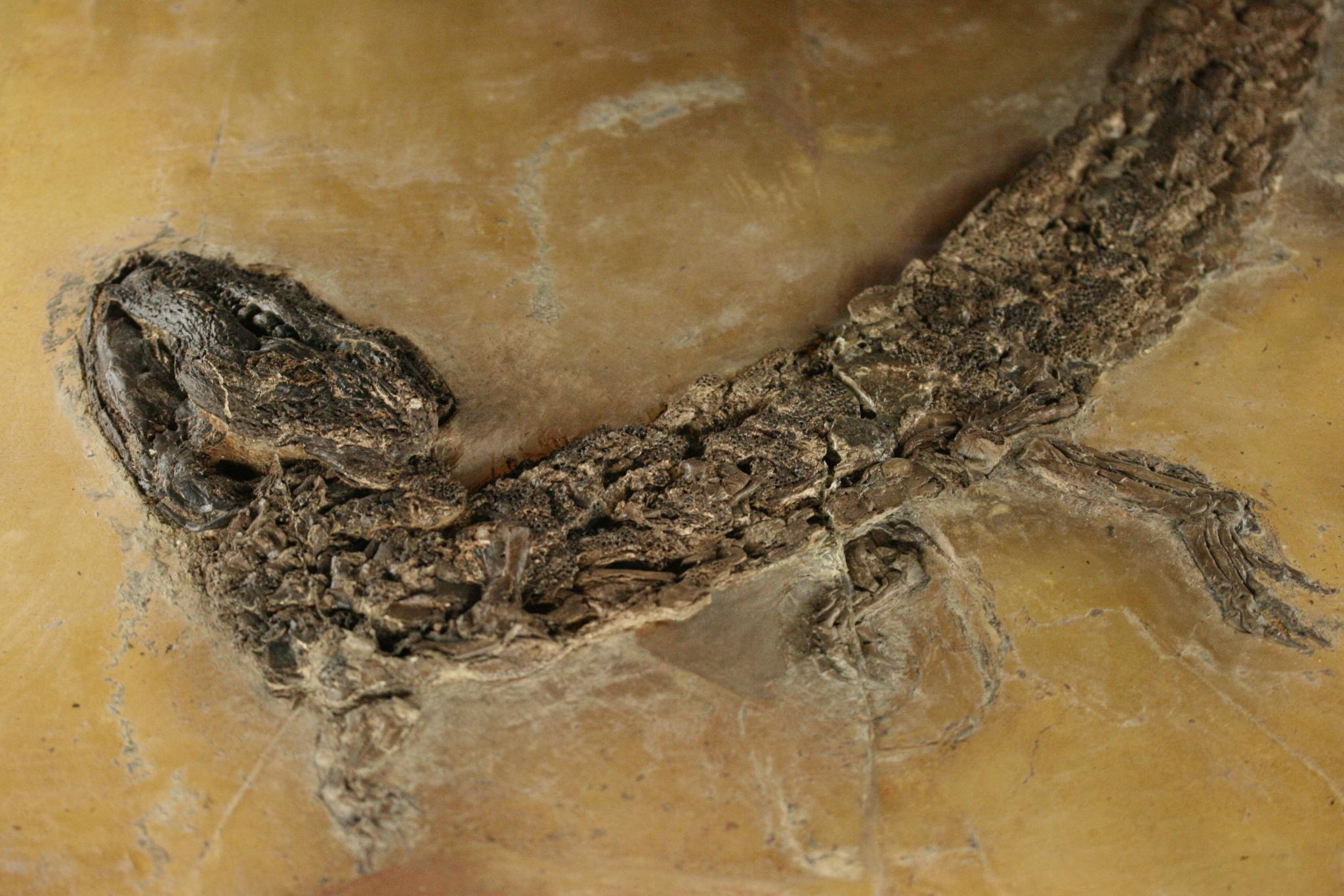
Specimen at the Natural History Museum of Basel

The cladogram below from the 2020 Cossette & Brochu study shows the placement of Hassiacosuchus within Alligatoridae:

- Alligatoroidea (stem-based group)
  - Leidyosuchus†
  - Deinosuchus†
  - Diplocynodontinae†
    Diplocynodon†
  - Alligatoridae (crown group)
    - Caimaninae (stem-based group)
    - Alligatorinae (stem-based group)
      - Ceratosuchus†
      - Hassiacosuchus†
      - Navajosuchus†
      - - Allognathosuchus†
        - - Alligator mcgrewi†
          - Alligator prenasalis†
        - - Wannaganosuchus†
          - - - Arambourgia†
              - Procaimanoidea†
            - - Alligator olseni†
              - crown Alligatorinae
