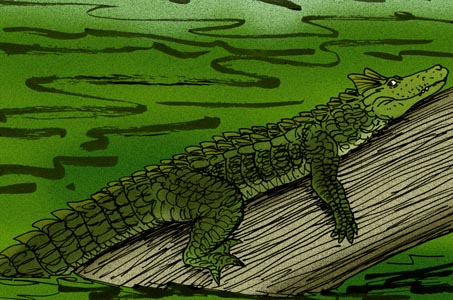
- Ceratosuchus burdoshi

Scientific classification
- Kingdom: Animalia
- Phylum: Chordata
- Class: Reptilia
- Order: Crocodylia
- Family: Alligatoridae
- Subfamily: Alligatorinae
- Genus: †Ceratosuchus; Schmidt, 1938

Type species
- †Ceratosuchus burdoshi Schmidt, 1938

= Ceratosuchus =

Ceratosuchus Temporal range: Late Paleocene 56.8–56 Ma

Extinct genus of reptiles

Ceratosuchus ("horned crocodile") is an extinct genus of alligatorine crocodylian from latest Paleocene rocks of Colorado's Piceance Basin and earliest Eocene rocks of Wyoming's Bighorn Basin in North America, a slice of time known as the Clarkforkian North American Land Mammal Age. Like its modern relatives, Ceratosuchus was a swamp-dwelling predator. It is named for the pair of flattened, triangular bony plates that extend from the back of its head.

The type species is C. burdoshi, a name chosen by the Field Museum after Theodore Burdosh discovered a nearly complete skull on an expedition to Western Colorado in 1937.

"Fortunately, a knob of bone projecting from an otherwise undistinguished piece of rock had caught the eye of Mr. Burdosh, and the block had been broughtto the Museum. When the rock was chipped away, the insignificant external lump proved to belong to a fairly complete skull of a fossil crocodilian allied to the alligators; and on one posterior corner it bore a triangualr horn-like knob which proved to be identical with the mysterious separate fragments."

== Description ==
Ceratosuchus was named in 1938 by K. P. Schmidt for a skull from Colorado. Further remains, including additional skulls, mandibles, and cervical armor, was recovered from Wyoming by University of Michigan paleontologists and described by William Bartels in 1984. The skull, of a moderately-size alligatorine, is most notable for its horns, formed by expansion of the bones (squamosals) that formed the rear corners of the skull roof. These horns were bulbous and pointed up. There were five teeth in both of the bones that made up the tip of the snout (premaxilla), fifteen in the paired maxillae that formed the sides of the upper jaw, and twenty in both dentaries of the lower jaw. The front of the lower jaw had a flattened shape, and the teeth located here pointed partially forward, with a spade-like form. The teeth had variable shapes; the first thirteen teeth in the lower jaw were pointed, while the last seven graded from a spatulate shape to a large globular shape. Aside from the horns, the skull and particularly the lower jaw of Ceratosuchus were very similar to that of its contemporary Allognathosuchus. The neck armor had blade-like keels that may have been aligned with the skull horns.

== Paleobiology ==
Although Ceratosuchus is the only known horned alligatorine, horns are not unknown in crocodilians; similar structures are known on two other species: Voay robustus and Crocodylus rhombifer. Bartels proposed that the horns' small size and bluntness made them unlikely weapons, and their small size also made use in a threat display unlikely. Instead, he favored their use as signals for species recognition: in this case, the horns would allow Ceratosuchus and species of Allognathosuchus to tell each other apart.

Ceratosuchus is known from overbank mudstone deposits. It so far has been a rare find compared to Allognathosuchus from the same rocks. Bartels reported that only 5% of Clarkforkian crocodilians collected by the University of Michigan can be certainly assigned to Ceratosuchus (although this may be partially artificial because fragmentary specimens of Ceratosuchus could be confused with Allognathosuchus). Ceratosuchus may have been ecologically restricted in comparison to Allognathosuchus.

Although the blunt posterior teeth of Allognathosuchus and Ceratosuchus have been traditionally interpreted as for feeding on mollusks or turtles, Bartels noted that these crocodilians were too small to feed on large bivalves or non-juvenile turtles, and that modern crocodilians usually swallow snails whole. Instead, he proposed that skull morphology and tooth wear better fit generalized predation on a variety of invertebrates and vertebrates.

== Classification ==
The precise placement of Ceratosuchus within Alligatoroidea is disputed. Some studies have shown it as a basal member of Alligatoridae, within the stem group Alligatorinae, as shown in the cladogram below.

- Alligatoroidea (stem group)
  - Leidyosuchus†
  - Deinosuchus†
  - Diplocynodontinae†
    Diplocynodon†
  - Alligatoridae (crown group)
    - Caimaninae (stem group)
    - Alligatorinae (stem group)
      - Ceratosuchus†
      - Hassiacosuchus†
      - Navajosuchus†
      - - Allognathosuchus†
        - - Alligator mcgrewi†
          - Alligator prenasalis†
        - - Wannaganosuchus†
          - - - Arambourgia†
              - Procaimanoidea†
            - - Alligator olseni†
              - crown Alligatorinae

Alternatively, other studies have recovered Ceratosuchus outside of Alligatoridae and Alligatorinae, as a basal member of Alligatoroidea within the clade Globidonta, as shown in the cladogram below.

- Alligatoroidea
  - Diplocynodontinae†
  - Globidonta
    - Leidyosuchus†
    - - Deinosuchus†
      - - - Navajosuchus†
          - Ceratosuchus†
          - - Stangerochampsa†
            - - Brachychampsa sealeyi†
              - - Brachychampsa montana†
                - Orientalosuchina†
                  - Eoalligator†
                  - Jiangxisuchus†
                  - Protoalligator†
                  - - Orientalosuchus†
                    - Krabisuchus†
        - Alligatoridae
          - Alligatorinae
          - Caimaninae
