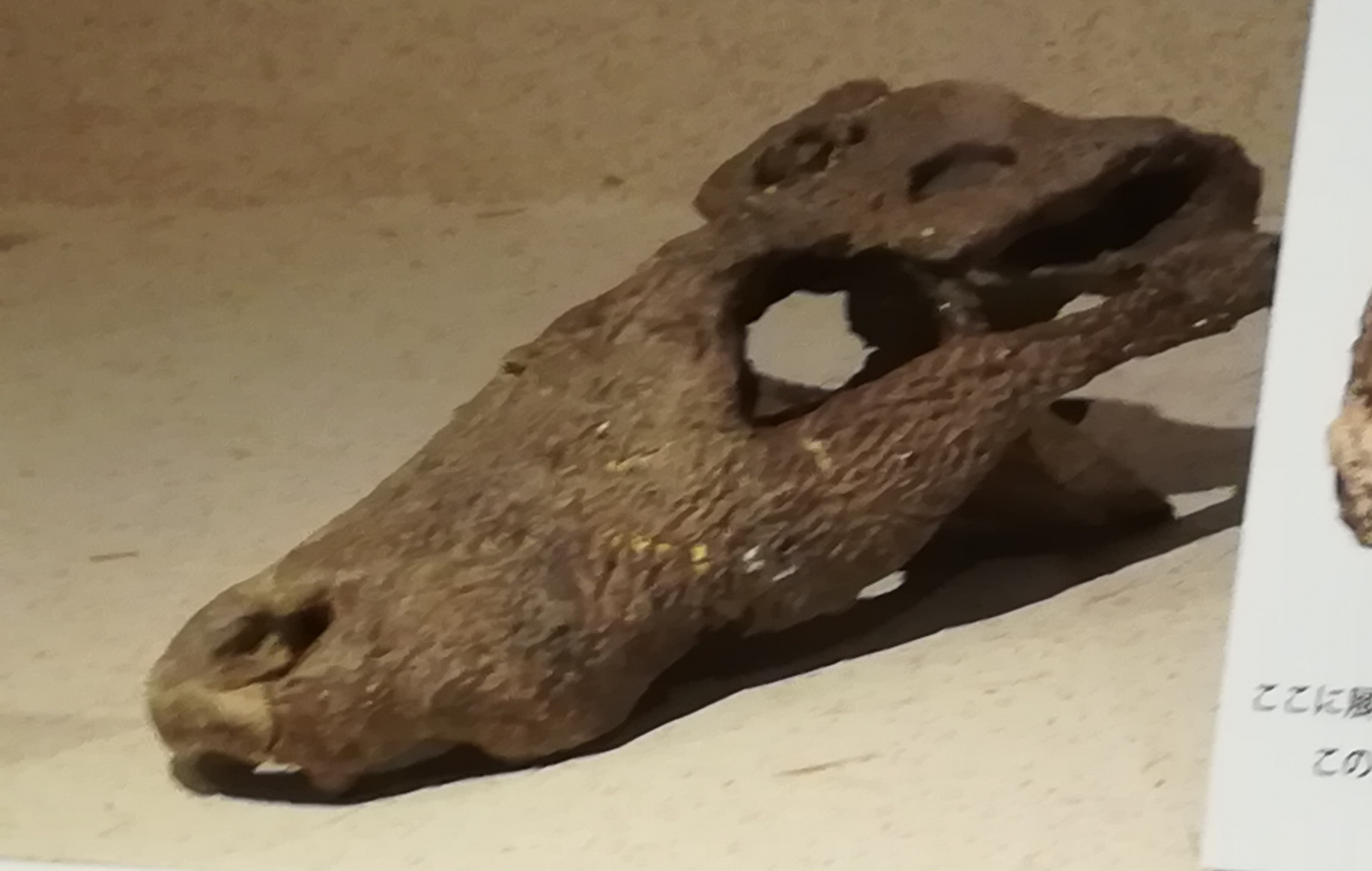
- Navajosuchus sp. in National Museum of Nature and Science

Scientific classification
- Kingdom: Animalia
- Phylum: Chordata
- Class: Reptilia
- Clade: Archosauria
- Order: Crocodilia
- Superfamily: Alligatoroidea
- Family: Alligatoridae
- Subfamily: Alligatorinae
- Genus: †Navajosuchus; Mook, 1942

Type species
- †Navajosuchus mooki (Simpson, 1930 [originally Allognathosuchus mooki])

= Navajosuchus =

Navajosuchus Temporal range: Paleocene, 64–61.6 Ma

Extinct genus of reptiles

Navajosuchus is an extinct genus of alligatorine crocodylian. Its fossils have been found in the Paleocene-age Nacimiento Formation of the San Juan Basin, New Mexico (United States). It was named in 1942 by Charles C. Mook, and the original type species was N. novomexicanus. N. novomexicanus was based on AMNH 5186, a partial skull collected in 1913. Later research showed that Navajosuchus novomexicanus was the same as the earlier-named Allognathosuchus mooki. However, A. mooki does not belong to the genus Allognathosuchus, and so the name of the crocodilian becomes Navajosuchus mooki. Under whichever name is used, this animal would have been a generalized predator of the Nacimiento floodplains. It was the most common Nacimiento Formation crocodilian, found in both the Puercan and Torrejonian faunal assemblages.

The precise placement of Navajosuchus within Alligatoroidea is disputed. Some studies have shown it as a basal member of Alligatoridae, within the stem-based group Alligatorinae, as shown in the cladogram below.

- Alligatoroidea (stem-based group)
  - Leidyosuchus†
  - Deinosuchus†
  - Diplocynodontinae†
    Diplocynodon†
  - Alligatoridae (crown group)
    - Caimaninae (stem-based group)
    - Alligatorinae (stem-based group)
      - Ceratosuchus†
      - Hassiacosuchus†
      - Navajosuchus†
      - - Allognathosuchus†
        - - Alligator mcgrewi†
          - Alligator prenasalis†
        - - Wannaganosuchus†
          - - - Arambourgia†
              - Procaimanoidea†
            - - Alligator olseni†
              - crown Alligatorinae

Alternatively, other studies have recovered Navajosuchus outside of Alligatoridae and Alligatorinae, as a basal member of Alligatoroidea within the clade Globidonta, as shown in the cladogram below.

- Alligatoroidea
  - Diplocynodontinae†
  - Globidonta
    - Leidyosuchus†
    - - Deinosuchus†
      - - - Navajosuchus†
          - Ceratosuchus†
          - - Stangerochampsa†
            - - Brachychampsa sealeyi†
              - - Brachychampsa montana†
                - Orientalosuchina†
                  - Eoalligator†
                  - Jiangxisuchus†
                  - Protoalligator†
                  - - Orientalosuchus†
                    - Krabisuchus†
        - Alligatoridae
          - Alligatorinae
          - Caimaninae
