= Lake Bonney =

Lake Bonney, Bonney Lake, Lake Bonny or Bonny Lake may refer to:

== Antarctica ==
- Lake Bonney (Antarctica), a frozen saline lake in the McMurdo Dry Valleys

== Australia ==
- Lake Bonney SE, a freshwater lake in the South East near Millicent, South Australia
- Lake Bonney Riverland, a freshwater lake in the Riverland near Barmera, South Australia

== United States ==
- Bonny Lakes, two high mountain ponds in the Eagle Cap Wilderness, Oregon
- Bonny Lake (Florida), a lake in Florida
- Bonney Lake, Washington, a city in Pierce County, Washington
- Bonny Lake State Park, a former state park in Colorado
