= Lake Bonny Park =

Park in Florida, USA

- Interactive map of Lake Bonny Park
- Nearest city: Lakeland, Florida
- Coordinates: 28.037°N 81.938°W
- Area: 113 acres (460,000 m^{2})

Lake Bonny Park, is a park in Lakeland, Polk County, Florida, in the United States bordering 249 acres (101 hectares) Lake Bonny. The park is home to Lakeland Skatepark, a $1.3 million state-of-the-art skate facility that opened in 2013 and has been used in photo shoots by Nike and other national advertisers. The skate park won the "Build It" award from the American Planning Association's Florida chapter. The park also has a lighted softball field, two lighted baseball fields and a multi-purpose field. In addition, there is a fishing pier, a 1.3 mile long jogging trail, and several other amenities. It is located directly between Lakeland High School and Southeastern University.
