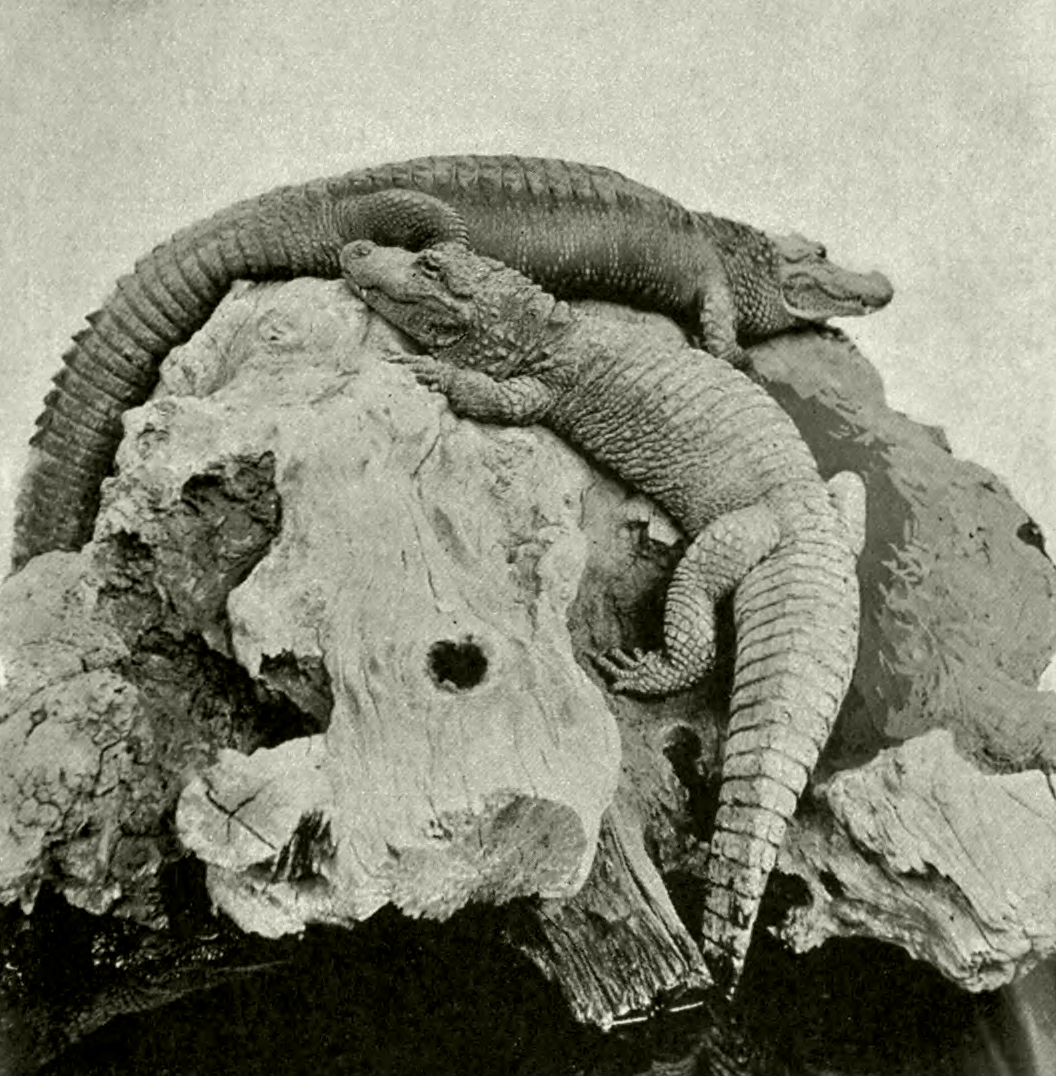
- 1905 photograph of an American alligator (top) and a Chinese alligator (bottom)

Scientific classification
- Kingdom: Animalia
- Phylum: Chordata
- Class: Reptilia
- Order: Crocodylia
- Family: Alligatoridae
- Subfamily: Alligatorinae
- Genus: Alligator; Cuvier, 1807

Type species
- Alligator mississippiensis Daudin, 1802

Species
- †Alligator hailensis; †Alligator luicus; †Alligator mcgrewi; †Alligator mefferdi; Alligator mississippiensis; †Alligator munensis; †Alligator olseni; †Alligator prenasalis; Alligator sinensis; †Alligator thomsoni

= Alligator =

Alligators Temporal range: 37.2 – 0 Ma Late Eocene – present

Large reptile in the genus Alligator

An alligator, or colloquially gator, is a large reptile in the genus Alligator of the family Alligatoridae in the order Crocodilia. The two extant species are the American alligator (A. mississippiensis) and the Chinese alligator (A. sinensis). Additionally, several extinct species of alligator are known from fossil remains. Alligators first appeared during the late Eocene epoch about 37 million years ago.

The term "alligator" is likely an anglicized form of el lagarto, Spanish for "the lizard", which early Spanish explorers and settlers in Florida called the alligator. Early English spellings of the name included allagarta and alagarto.

Alligators are notable for their ability to inhabit climates that are considerably more temperate than those of most other crocodilians. Although they generally prefer subtropical to tropical regions, they are also capable of surviving colder winters in the northern parts of their range.

== Evolution ==
Alligators and caimans split in North America during the early Tertiary or late Cretaceous (about 53 million to 65 million years ago). The Chinese alligator split from the American alligator about 33 million years ago and probably descended from a lineage that crossed the Bering land bridge during the Neogene. The modern American alligator is well represented in the fossil record of the Pleistocene. The alligator's full mitochondrial genome was sequenced in the 1990s. The full genome, published in 2014, suggests that the alligator evolved much more slowly than mammals and birds.

== Phylogeny ==
The genus Alligator belongs to the subfamily Alligatorinae, which is the sister taxon to Caimaninae (the caimans). Together, these two subfamilies form the family Alligatoridae. The cladogram below shows the phylogeny of alligators.

- Alligatoridae
  - Caimaninae
  - Alligatorinae
    - Ceratosuchus burdoshi†
    - Hassiacosuchus haupti†
    - Navajosuchus mooki†
    - - Wannaganosuchus brachymanus†
      - Arambourgia gaudryi†
      - - Allognathosuchus polyodon†
        - Allognathosuchus wartheni†
        - Procaimanoidea kayi†
      - Alligator
        - Alligator prenasalis†
        - - Alligator mcgrewi†
          - - Alligator olseni†
            - - Alligator sinensis Chinese alligator
              - - Alligator thomsoni†
                - Alligator mefferdi†
                - Alligator mississippiensis American alligator

== Species ==
=== Extant ===
Image	Scientific name	Common name	Distribution
	Alligator mississippiensis	American alligator	the Southeastern United States
	Alligator sinensis	Chinese alligator	eastern China

=== Extinct ===
- Alligator hailensis
- Alligator luicus
- Alligator mcgrewi
- Alligator mefferdi
- Alligator munensis
- Alligator olseni
- Alligator prenasalis
- Alligator thomsoni

== Description ==
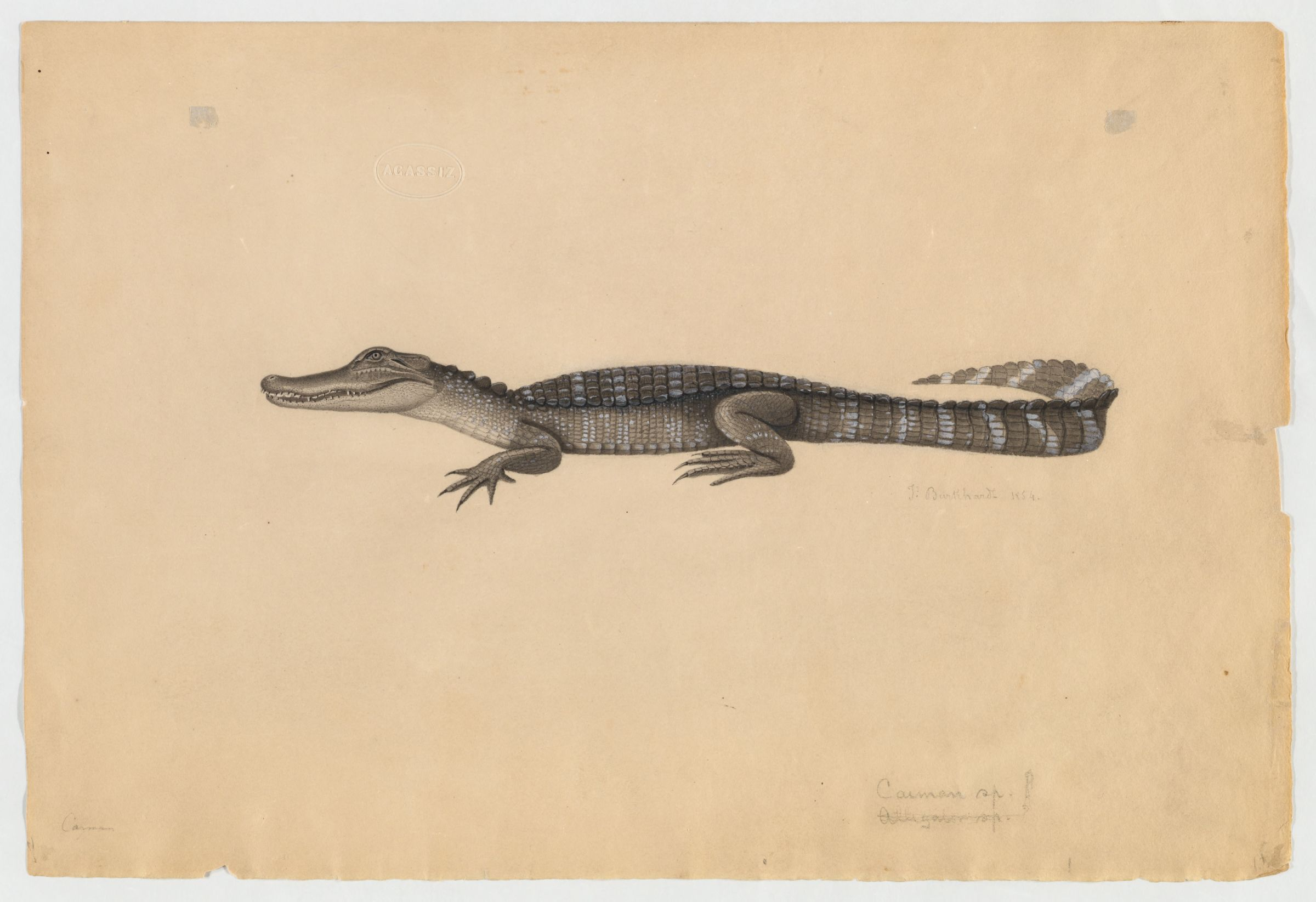
An 1854 watercolor painting of an alligator from the Cayman Islands by Jacques Burkhardt.

An average adult American alligator's weight and length is 360 kg (790 lb) and 4 m (13 ft), but they sometimes grow to 4.4 m (14 ft) long and weigh over 450 kg (990 lb). The largest ever recorded, found in Louisiana, measured 5.84 m (19.2 ft). The Chinese alligator is smaller, rarely exceeding 2.1 m (7 ft) in length. Additionally, it weighs considerably less, with males rarely over 45 kg (100 lb).

Adult alligators are black or dark olive-brown with white undersides, while juveniles have bright yellow or whitish stripes which sharply contrast against their dark hides, providing them additional camouflage amongst reeds and wetland grasses.

Alligators commonly live up to 50 years, but there have been examples of alligators living over 70. One of the oldest recorded alligator lives was that of Saturn, an American alligator who was hatched in 1936 in Mississippi and spent nearly a decade in Germany before spending the majority of his life at the Moscow Zoo, where he died at the age of 83 or 84 on 22 May 2020. Another one of the oldest lives on record is that of Muja, an American alligator who was brought as an adult specimen to the Belgrade Zoo in Serbia from Germany in 1937. Although no valid records exist about his date of birth, as of 2012, he was in his 80s and possibly the oldest alligator living in captivity.

== Habitat ==
A. mississippiensis

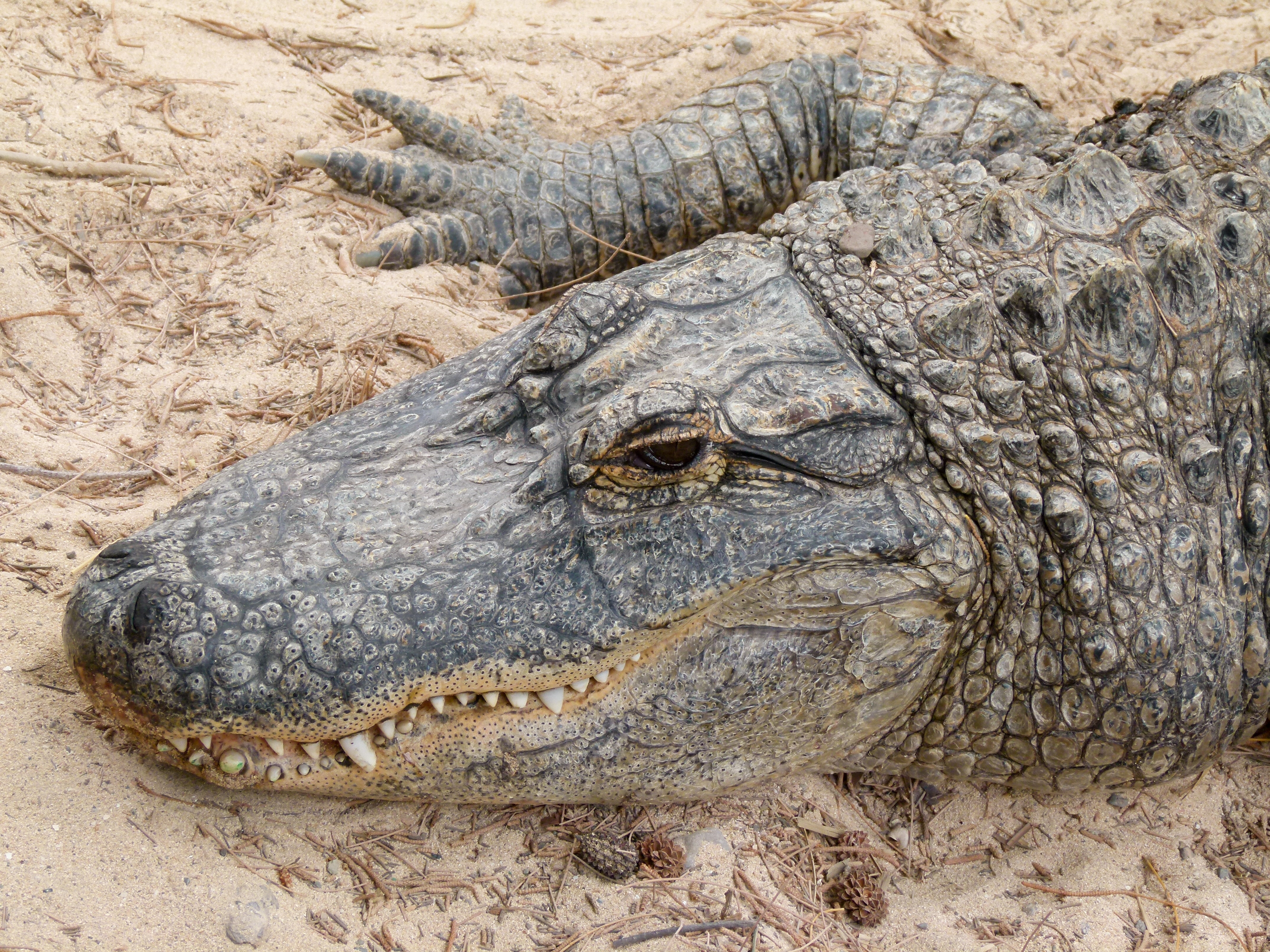
Head

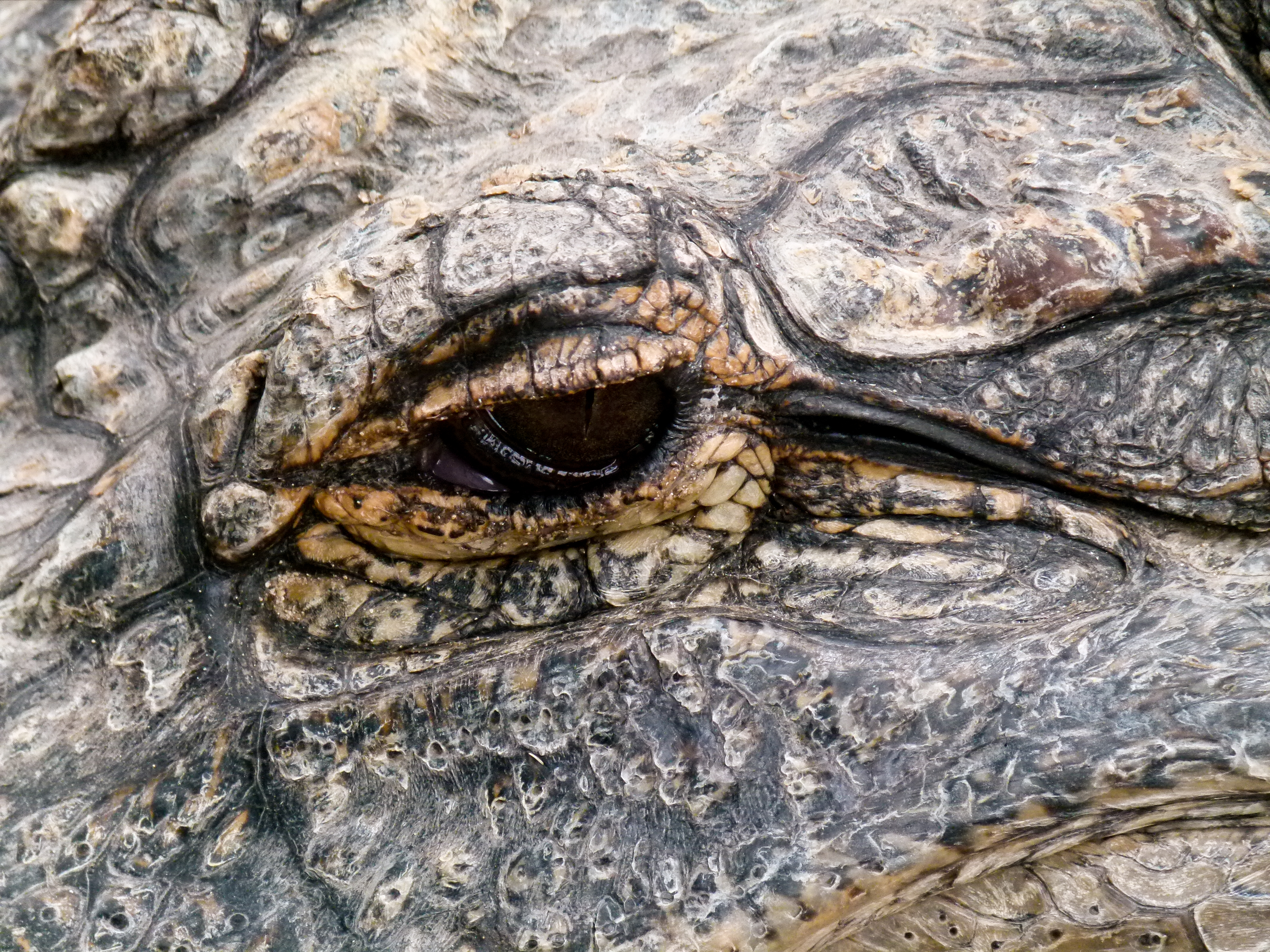
Eye

Alligators are native only to the United States and China.

American alligators are found in the southeast United States: all of Florida and Louisiana; the southern parts of Georgia, Alabama, and Mississippi; coastal South and North Carolina; East Texas, the southeast corner of Oklahoma, and the southern tip of Arkansas. Louisiana has the largest alligator population. The majority of American alligators inhabit Florida and Louisiana, with over a million alligators in each state. Southern Florida is the only place where both alligators and crocodiles coexist.

American alligators live in freshwater environments, such as ponds, wetlands, rivers, and lakes, as well as in brackish water. When they construct alligator holes in the wetlands, they increase plant diversity and provide habitat for other animals during droughts. They are, therefore, considered an important species for maintaining ecological diversity in wetlands. Farther west, in Louisiana, heavy grazing by nutrias and muskrats is causing severe damage to coastal wetlands. Large alligators feed extensively on nutrias, and provide a vital ecological service by reducing nutria numbers.

The Chinese alligator currently is found in only the Yangtze River valley and parts of adjacent provinces and is extremely endangered, with only a few dozen believed to be left in the wild. Far more Chinese alligators live in zoos around the world than can be found in the wild. Rockefeller Wildlife Refuge in southern Louisiana has several in captivity in an attempt to preserve the species. Miami MetroZoo in Florida also has a breeding pair of Chinese alligators.

== Behavior ==
Alligator vocalisations
Alligator Bellow (sound)
Alligator bellow, ogg/Vorbis format.

Another alligator bellow
Alligator bellow, ogg/Vorbis format.

Alligator hiss
Alligator hiss ogg/Vorbis format.

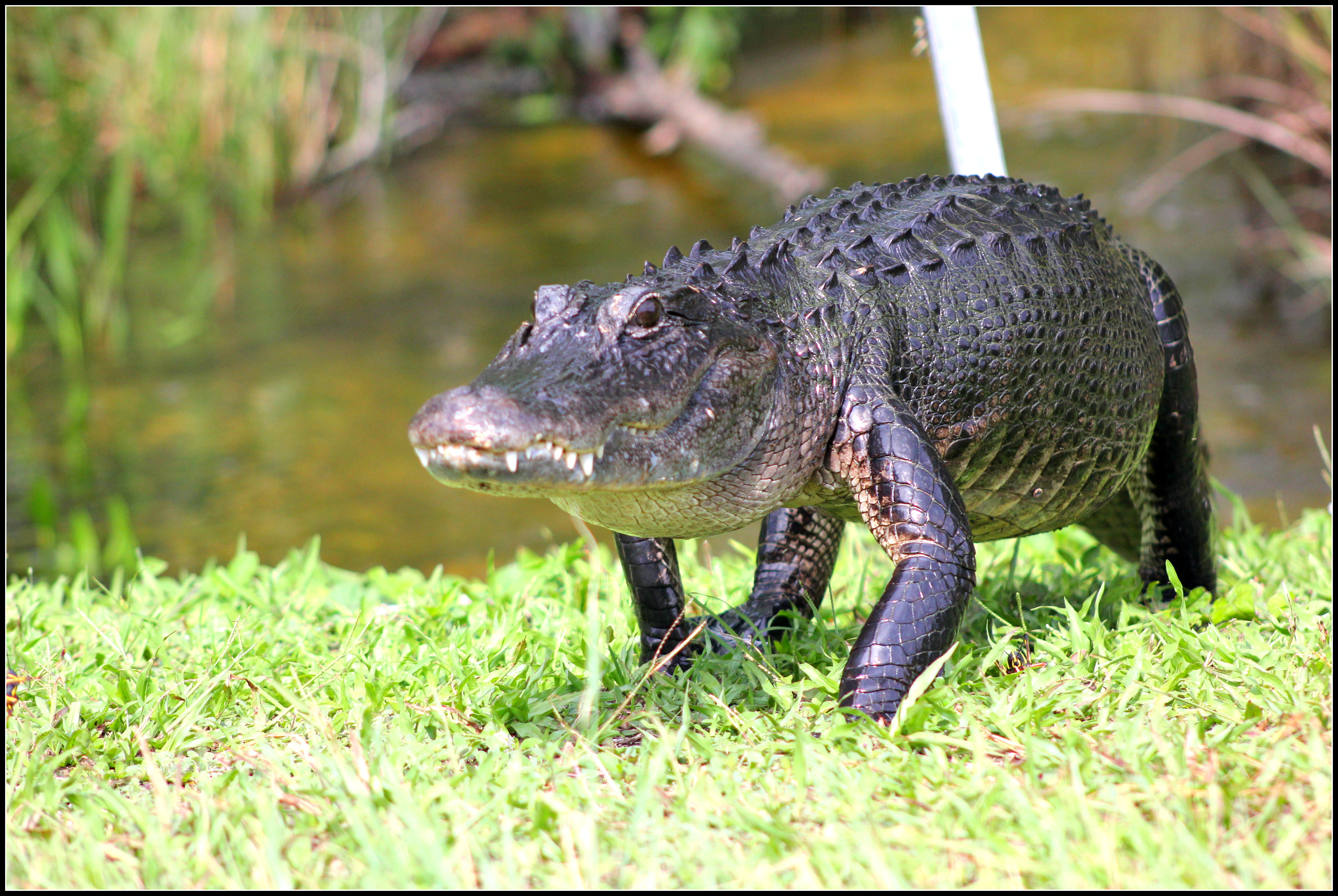
"High walk" of an alligator

Large male alligators are solitary territorial animals. Smaller alligators can often be found in large numbers close to each other. The largest of the species (both males and females) defend prime territory; smaller alligators have a higher tolerance for other alligators within a similar size class.

Alligators move on land by two forms of locomotion, referred to as "sprawl" and "high walk". The sprawl is a forward movement with the belly making contact with the ground and is used to transition to "high walk" or to slither over wet substrate into water. The high walk is an up-on-four-limbs forward motion used for overland travel with the belly well up from the ground. Alligators have also been observed to rise up and balance on their hind legs and semi-step forward as part of a forward or upward lunge. However, they cannot walk on their hind legs.

Although the alligator has a heavy body and a slow metabolism, it is capable of short bursts of speed, especially in very short lunges. Alligators' main prey are smaller animals they can kill and eat with a single bite. They may kill larger prey by grabbing it and dragging it into the water to drown. Alligators consume food that cannot be eaten in one bite by allowing it to rot or by biting and then performing a "death roll", spinning or convulsing wildly until bite-sized chunks are torn off. Critical to the alligator's ability to initiate a death roll, the tail must flex to a significant angle relative to its body. An alligator with an immobilized tail cannot perform a death roll.

Most of the muscle in an alligator's jaw evolved to bite and grip prey. The muscles that close the jaws are powerful, but the muscles for opening their jaws are weak. As a result, an adult human can hold an alligator's jaws shut bare-handed. It is common to use several wraps of duct tape to prevent an adult alligator from opening its jaws when being handled or transported.

Alligators are generally timid towards humans and tend to walk or swim away if one approaches. This may encourage people to approach alligators and their nests, which can provoke the animals into attacking. In Florida, feeding wild alligators at any time is illegal. If fed, the alligators will eventually lose their fear of humans and will learn to associate humans with food.

== Diet ==
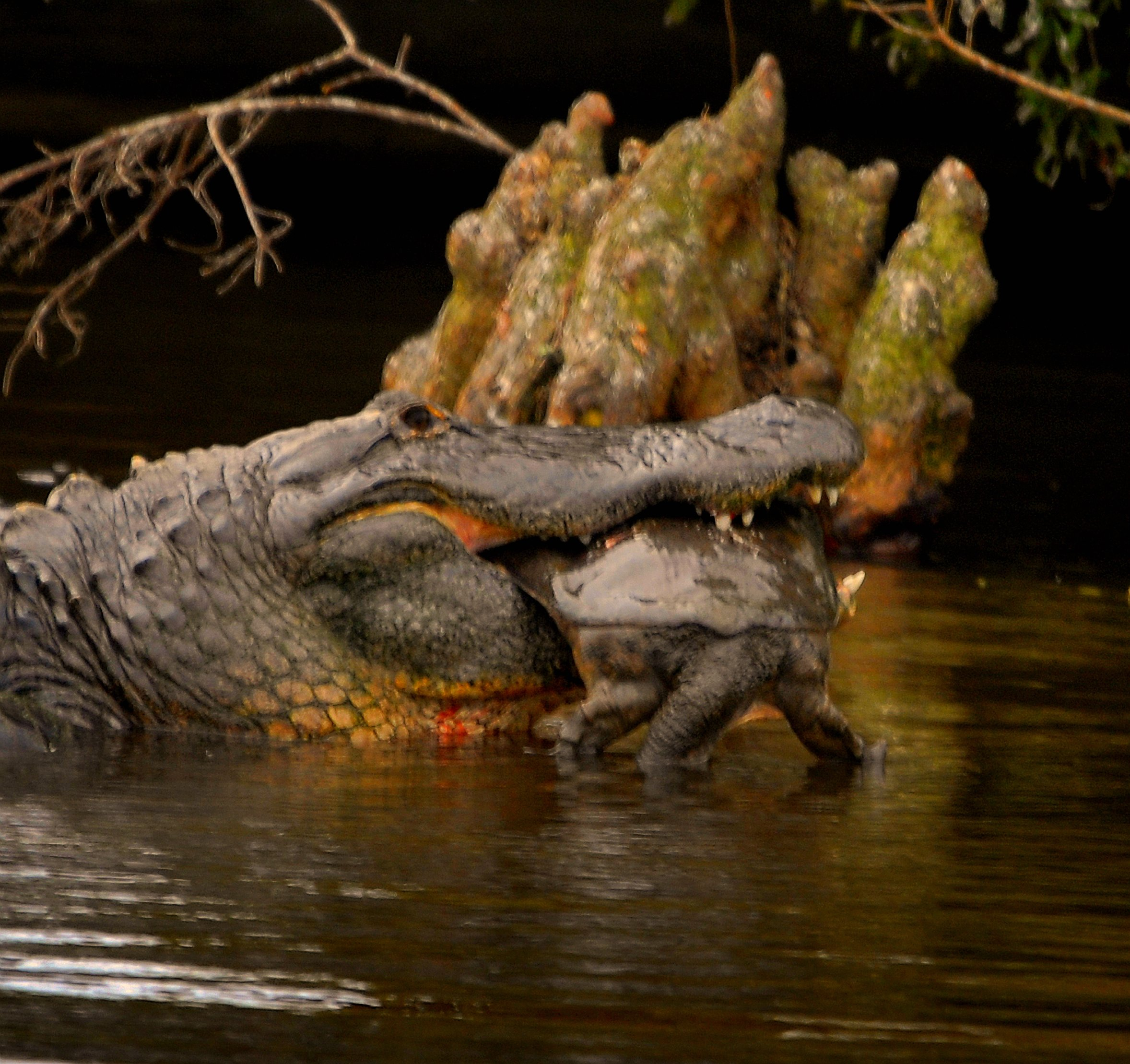
Alligator feeding on a Florida softshell turtle

The type of food eaten by alligators depends upon their age and size. When they are young, alligators eat fish, insects, snails, crustaceans, and worms. As they mature, progressively larger prey is taken, including larger fish, such as gar, turtles, and various mammals, particularly nutrias and muskrats, as well as birds, deer, and other reptiles. Their stomachs also often contain gizzard stones. They will consume carrion if they are sufficiently hungry. In some cases, larger alligators are known to ambush dogs, Florida panthers, and black bears, making them the apex predator throughout their distribution. In this role as a top predator, it may determine the abundance of prey species, including turtles and nutrias.

== Reproduction ==
Different stages of alligator life-cycle

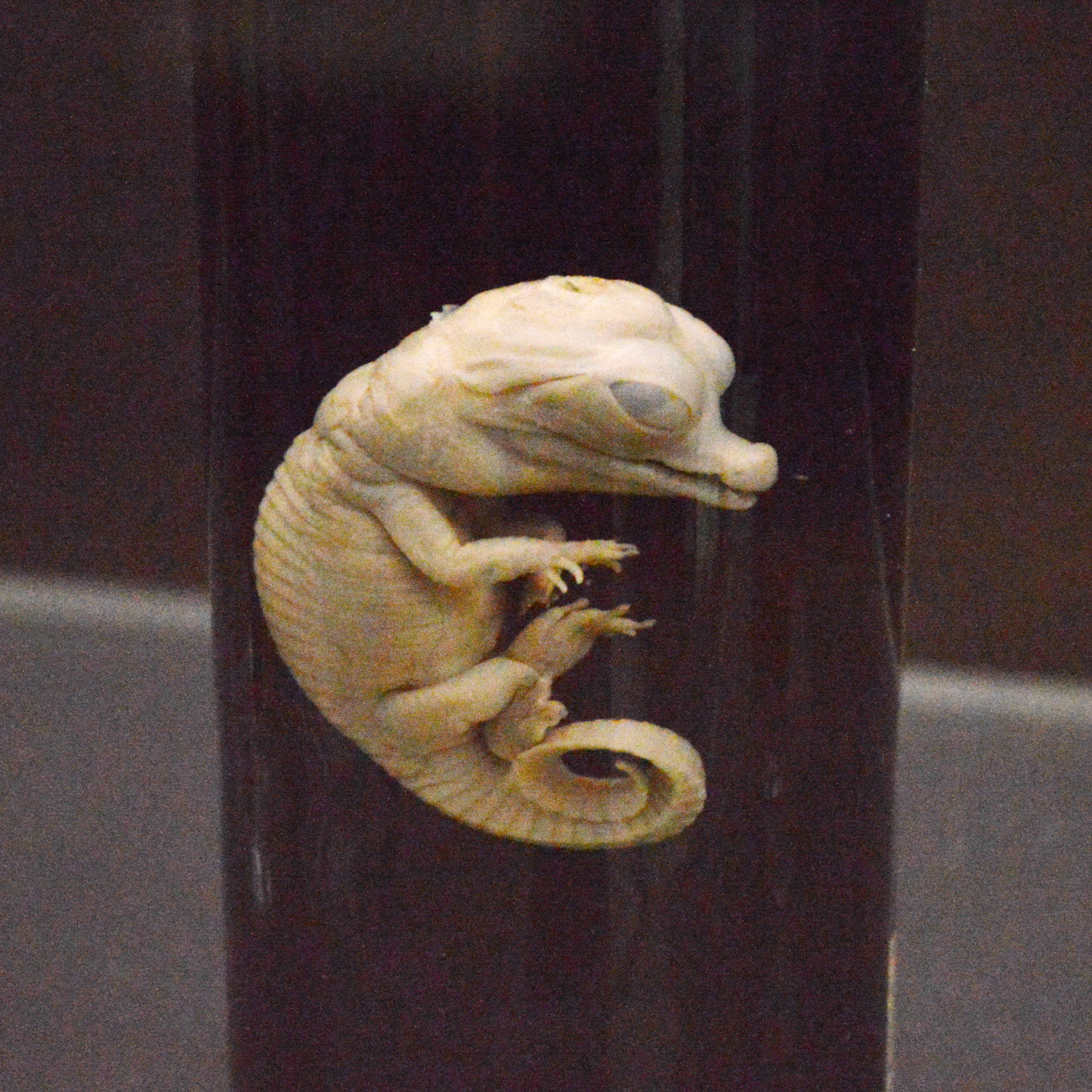
Embryo

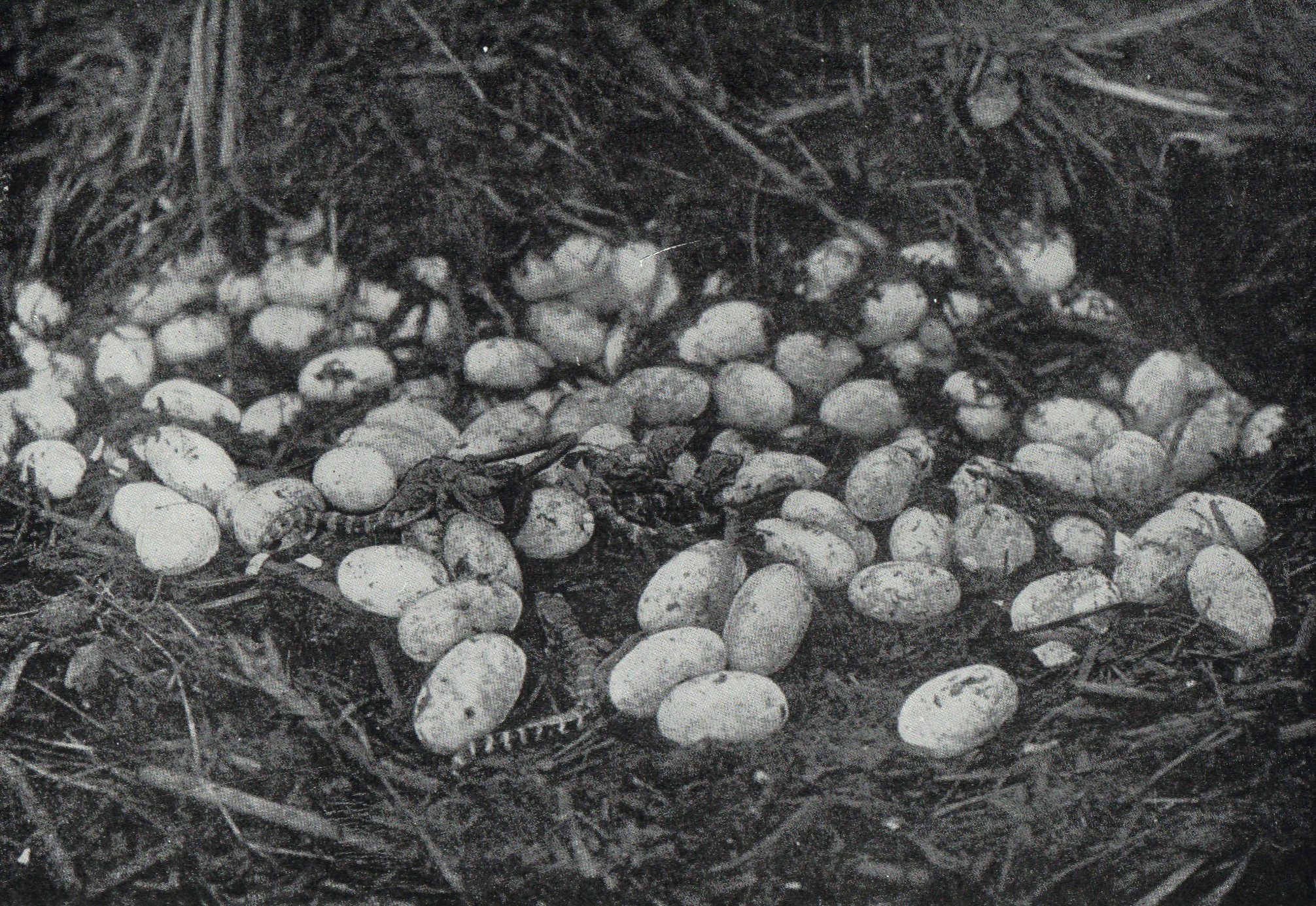
Eggs and young

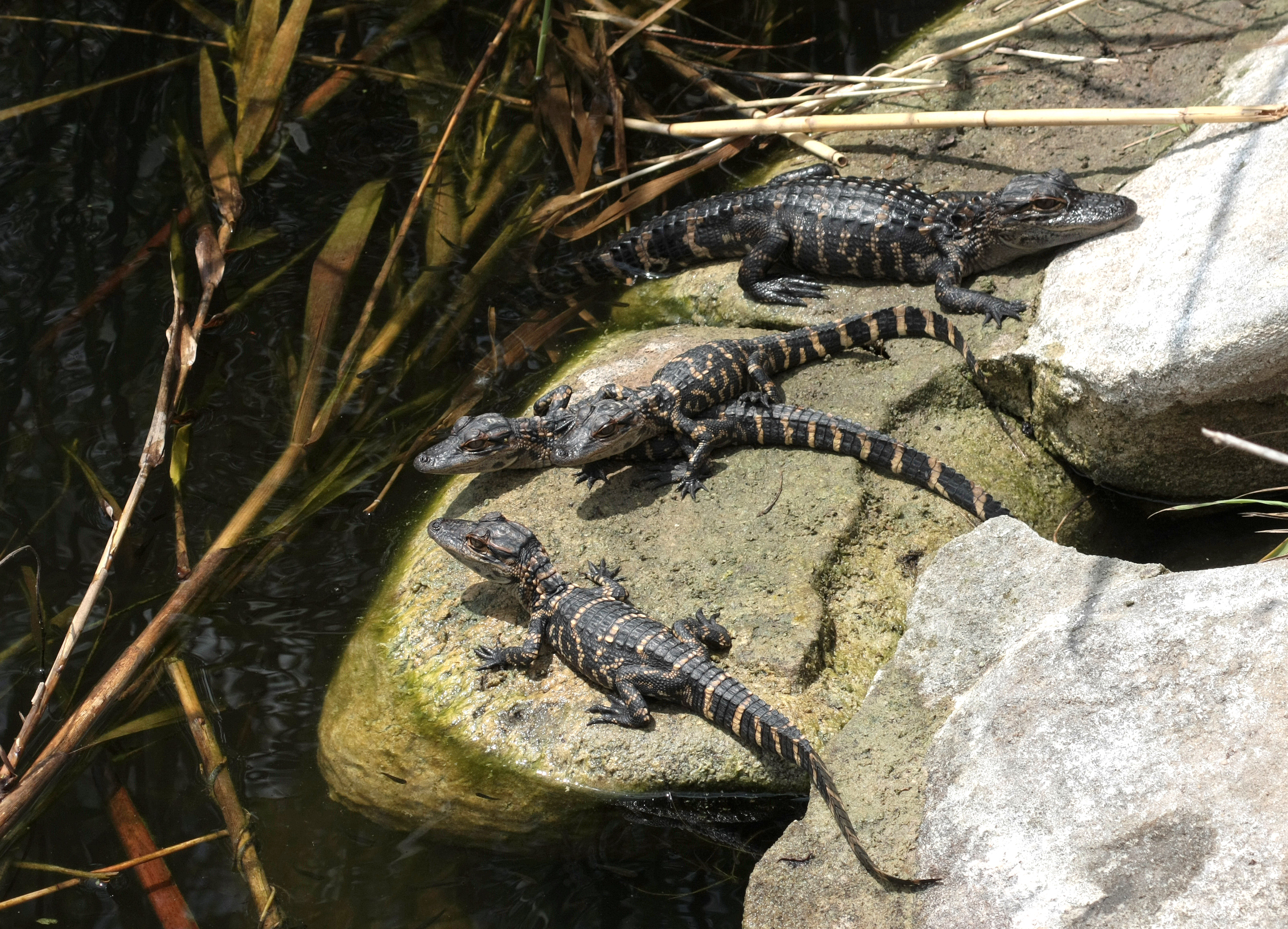
Juveniles

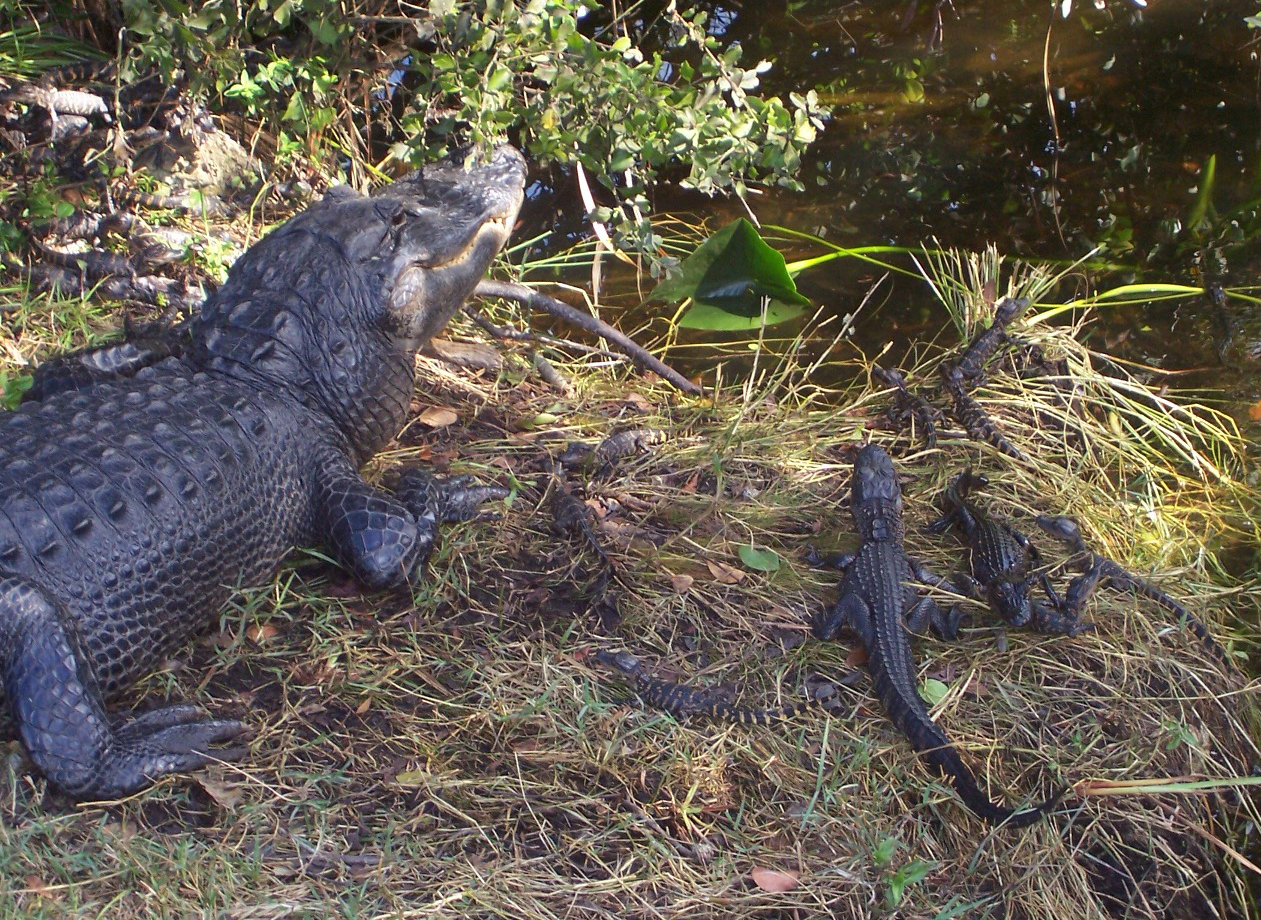
An adult with juveniles of various ages

Alligators generally mature at a length of 1.8 m (6 ft). The mating season is in late spring. In April and May, alligators form so-called "bellowing choruses". Large groups of animals bellow together for a few minutes a few times a day, usually one to three hours after sunrise. The bellows of male American alligators are accompanied by powerful blasts of infrasound. Another form of male display is a loud head-slap. In 2010, on spring nights alligators were found to gather in large numbers for group courtship, the so-called "alligator dances".

In summer, the female builds a nest of vegetation where the decomposition of the vegetation provides the heat needed to incubate the eggs. The sex of the offspring is determined by the temperature in the nest and is fixed within seven to 21 days of the start of incubation. Incubation temperatures of 30 °C (86 °F) or lower produce a clutch of females; those of 34 °C (93 °F) or higher produce entirely males. Nests constructed on leaves are hotter than those constructed on wet marsh, so the former tend to produce males and the latter, females. The baby alligator's egg tooth helps it get out of its egg during hatching time. The natural sex ratio at hatching is five females to one male. Females hatched from eggs incubated at 30 °C (86 °F) weigh significantly more than males hatched from eggs incubated at 34 °C (93 °F). The mother defends the nest from predators and assists the hatchlings to water. She will provide protection to the young for about a year if they remain in the area. Adult alligators regularly cannibalize younger individuals, though estimates of the rate of cannibalism vary widely. In the past, immediately following the outlawing of alligator hunting, populations rebounded quickly due to the suppressed number of adults preying upon juveniles, increasing survival among the young alligators.

== Anatomy ==
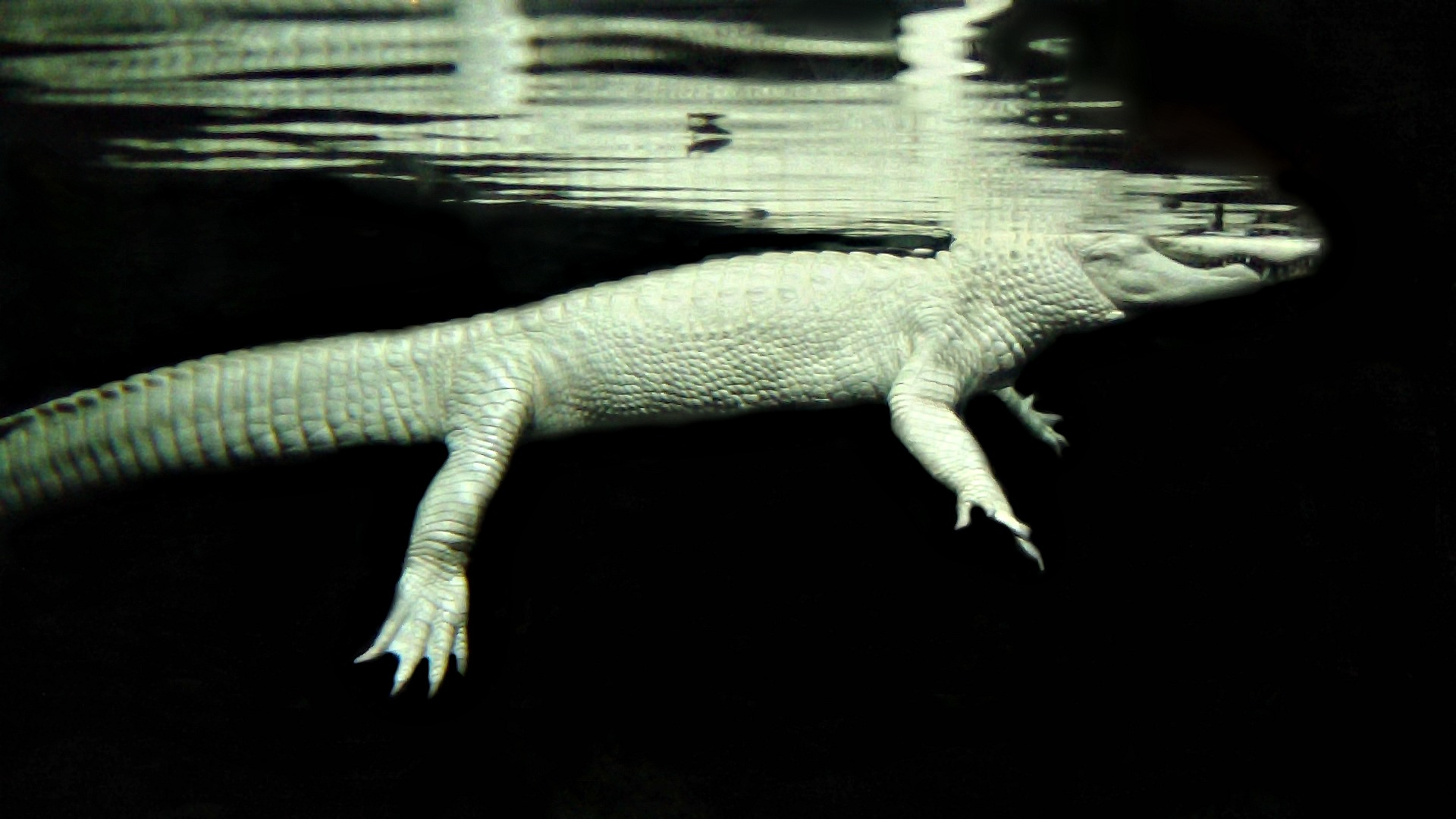
A rare albino alligator swimming

Alligators, much like birds, have been shown to exhibit unidirectional movement of air through their lungs. Most other amniotes are believed to exhibit bidirectional, or tidal breathing. For a tidal breathing animal, such as a mammal, air flows into and out of the lungs through branching bronchi which terminate in small dead-end chambers called alveoli. As the alveoli represent dead-ends to flow, the inspired air must move back out the same way it came in. In contrast, air in alligator lungs makes a circuit, moving in only one direction through the parabronchi. The air first enters the outer branch, moves through the parabronchi, and exits the lung through the inner branch. Oxygen exchange takes place in extensive vasculature around the parabronchi.

The alligator has a similar digestive system to that of the crocodile, with minor differences in morphology and enzyme activity. Alligators have a two-part stomach, with the first smaller portion containing gastroliths. It is believed this portion of the stomach serves a similar function as it does in the gizzard of some species of birds, to aid in digestion. The gastroliths work to grind up the meal as alligators will take large bites or swallow smaller prey whole. This process makes digestion and nutrient absorption easier once the food reaches the second portion of the stomach. Once an alligator's meal has been processed it will move on to the second portion of the stomach which is highly acidic. The acidity of the stomach has been observed to increase once digestion begins. This is due to the increase in CO_{2} concentration of the blood, resulting from the right to left shunting of the alligators heart. The right to left shunt of the heart in alligators means the circulatory system will recirculate blood through the body instead of back to the lungs. The re-circulation of blood leads to higher CO_{2} concentration as well as lower oxygen affinity. There is evidence to suggest that there is increased blood flow diverted to the stomach during digestion to facilitate an increase in CO_{2} concentration which aids in increasing gastric acid secretions during digestion. The alligator's metabolism will also increase after a meal by up to four times its basal metabolic rate. Alligators also have highly folded mucosa in the lining of the intestines to further aid in the absorption of nutrients. The folds result in greater surface area for the nutrients to be absorbed through.

Alligators also have complex microbiomes that are not fully understood yet, but can be attributed to both benefits and costs to the animal. These microorganisms can be found in the high surface area of the mucosa folds of the intestines, as well as throughout the digestive tract. Benefits include better total health and stronger immune system. However alligators are still vulnerable to microbial infections despite the immune boost from other microbiota.

During brumation the process of digestion experiences changes due to the fasting most alligators experience during these periods of inactivity. Alligators that go long enough without a meal during brumation will begin a process called autophagy, where the animal begins to consume its fat reserves to maintain its body weight until it can acquire a sufficient meal. There is also fluctuation in the level of bacterial taxa populations in the alligator's microbial community between seasons which helps the alligator cope with different rates of feeding and activity.

Like other crocodilians, alligators have an armor of bony scutes. The dermal bones are highly vascularised and aid in calcium balance, both to neutralize acids while the animal cannot breathe underwater and to provide calcium for eggshell formation.

Alligators have muscular, flat tails that propel them while swimming.

The two kinds of white alligators are albino and leucistic. These alligators are practically impossible to find in the wild. They could survive only in captivity and are few in number. The Aquarium of the Americas in New Orleans has leucistic alligators found in a Louisiana swamp in 1987.

== Human uses ==
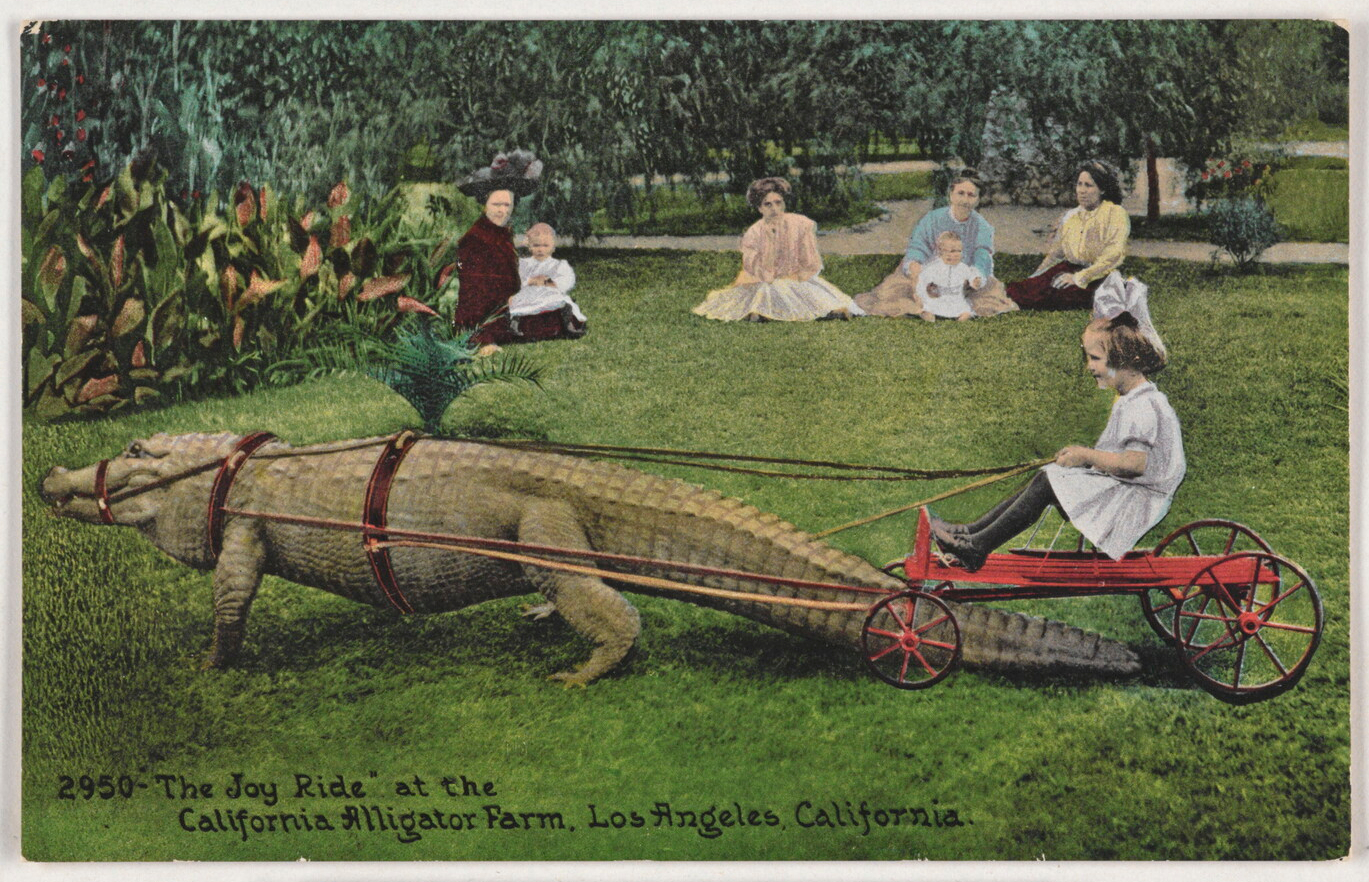
Edward H. Mitchell, "The Joy Ride" at the California Alligator Farm, Los Angeles, California, c. 1910s

Alligators are raised commercially for their meat and their skin, which when tanned is used for the manufacture of luggage, handbags, shoes, belts, and other leather items. Alligators also provide economic benefits through the ecotourism industry. Visitors may take swamp tours, in which alligators are a feature. Their most important economic benefit to humans may be the control of nutrias and muskrats.

Alligator meat is also consumed by humans.

== Differences from crocodiles ==
While there are rules of thumb for distinguishing alligators from crocodiles, all of them admit exceptions. Such general rules include:

- Exposed vs. interdigitated teeth: The easiest way to distinguish crocodiles from alligators is by looking at their jaw line. The teeth on the lower jaw of an alligator fit into sockets in the upper jaw, leaving only the upper teeth visible when the mouth is closed. The teeth on the lower jaw of a crocodile fit into grooves on the outside of the top jaw, making both the upper and lower teeth visible when the mouth is closed, thus creating a "toothy grin".
- Shape of the nose and jaw: Alligators have wider, shovel-like, U-shaped snouts, while crocodile snouts are typically more pointed or V-shaped. The alligators' broader snouts have been contentiously thought to allow their jaws to withstand the stress of cracking open the shells of turtles and other hard-shelled animals that are widespread in their environments. A 2012 study found very little correlation between bite force and snout shape amongst 23 tested crocodilian species.
- Functioning salt glands: Crocodilians have modified salivary glands called salt glands on their tongues, but while these organs still excrete salt in crocodiles and gharials, those in most alligators and caimans have lost this ability, or excrete it in only extremely small quantities. The ability to excrete excess salt allows crocodiles to better tolerate life in saline water and migrating through it. Because alligators and caimans have lost this ability, they are largely restricted to freshwater habitats, although larger alligators do sometimes live in tidal mangroves and in very rare cases in coastal areas.
- Integumentary sense organs: Both crocodiles and alligators have small, pit-like sensory organs called integumentary sense organs (ISOs) or dermal pressure receptors (DPRs) surrounding their upper and lower jaws. These organs allow crocodilians to detect minor pressure changes in surrounding water, and assist them in locating and capturing prey. In crocodiles, however, such organs extend over nearly the entire body. Crocodile ISOs may also assist in detection of local salinity, or serve other chemosensory functions.
- Less consistent differences: Crocodiles are generally thought of as more aggressive than alligators. Of the 26 crocodilian species, only six are considered dangerous to adult human beings, most notably the Nile crocodile and saltwater crocodile. Each year, hundreds of deadly attacks are attributed to the Nile crocodile in sub-Saharan Africa. The American crocodile is considered to fall in the middle of crocodilians temperamentally, with only a few cases of American crocodiles fatally attacking humans having been reported. American alligator attacks and fatalities are rare compared to crocodile attacks, with many reported alligator fatalities involving children or the elderly.

== Image gallery of extant species ==
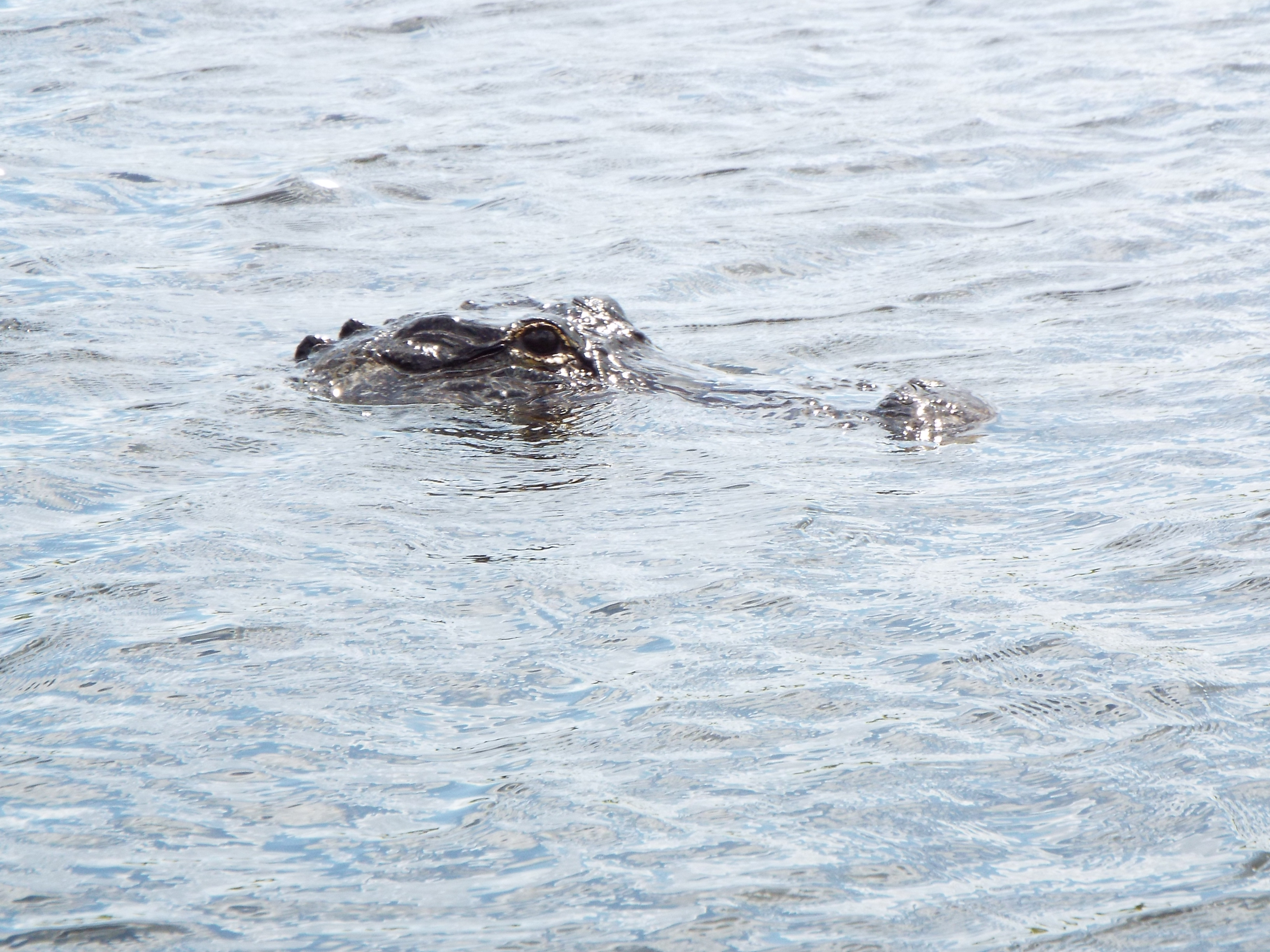
Alligator in the Everglades National Park

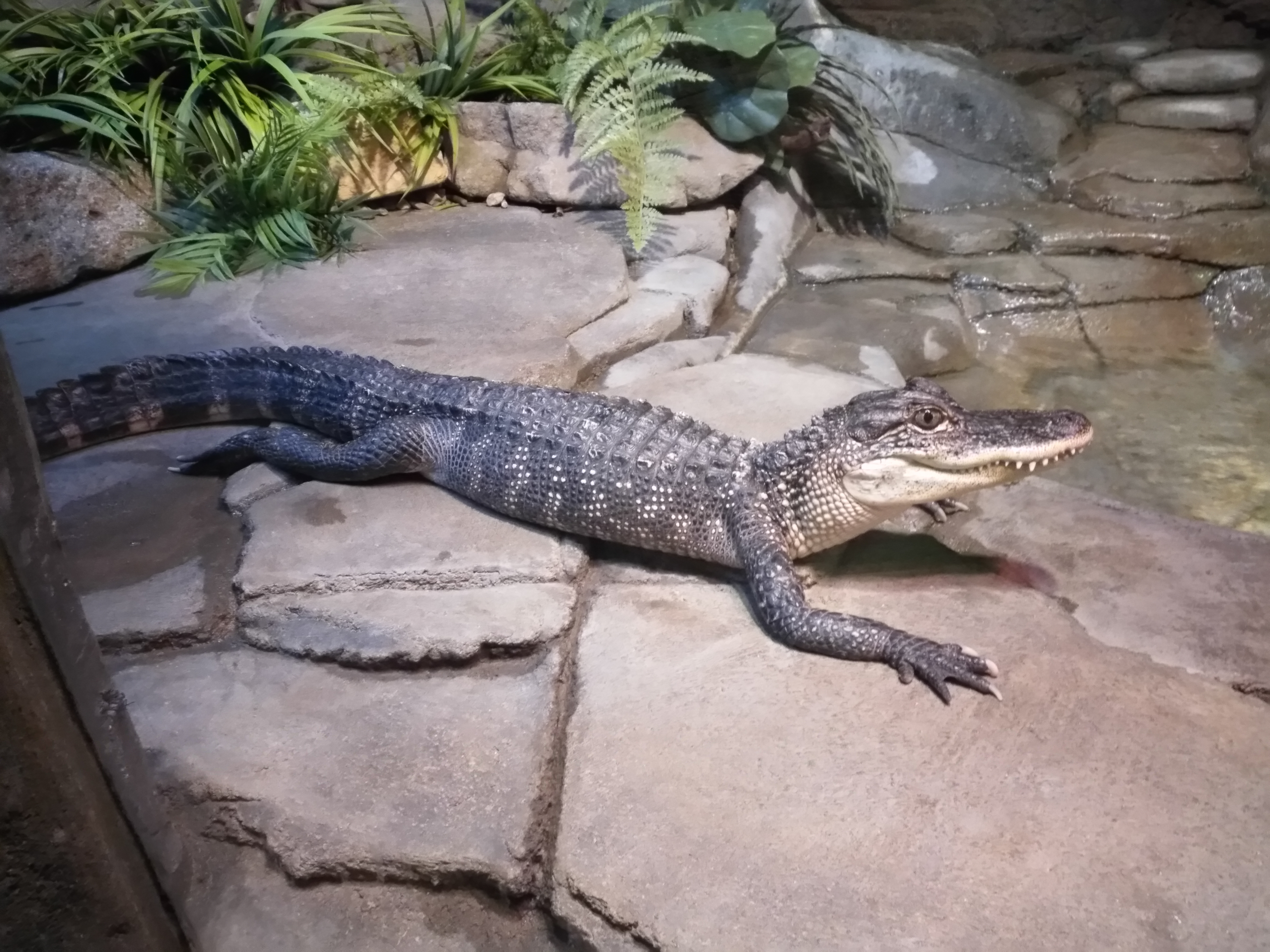
Alligator in the Canberra Zoo in Australia

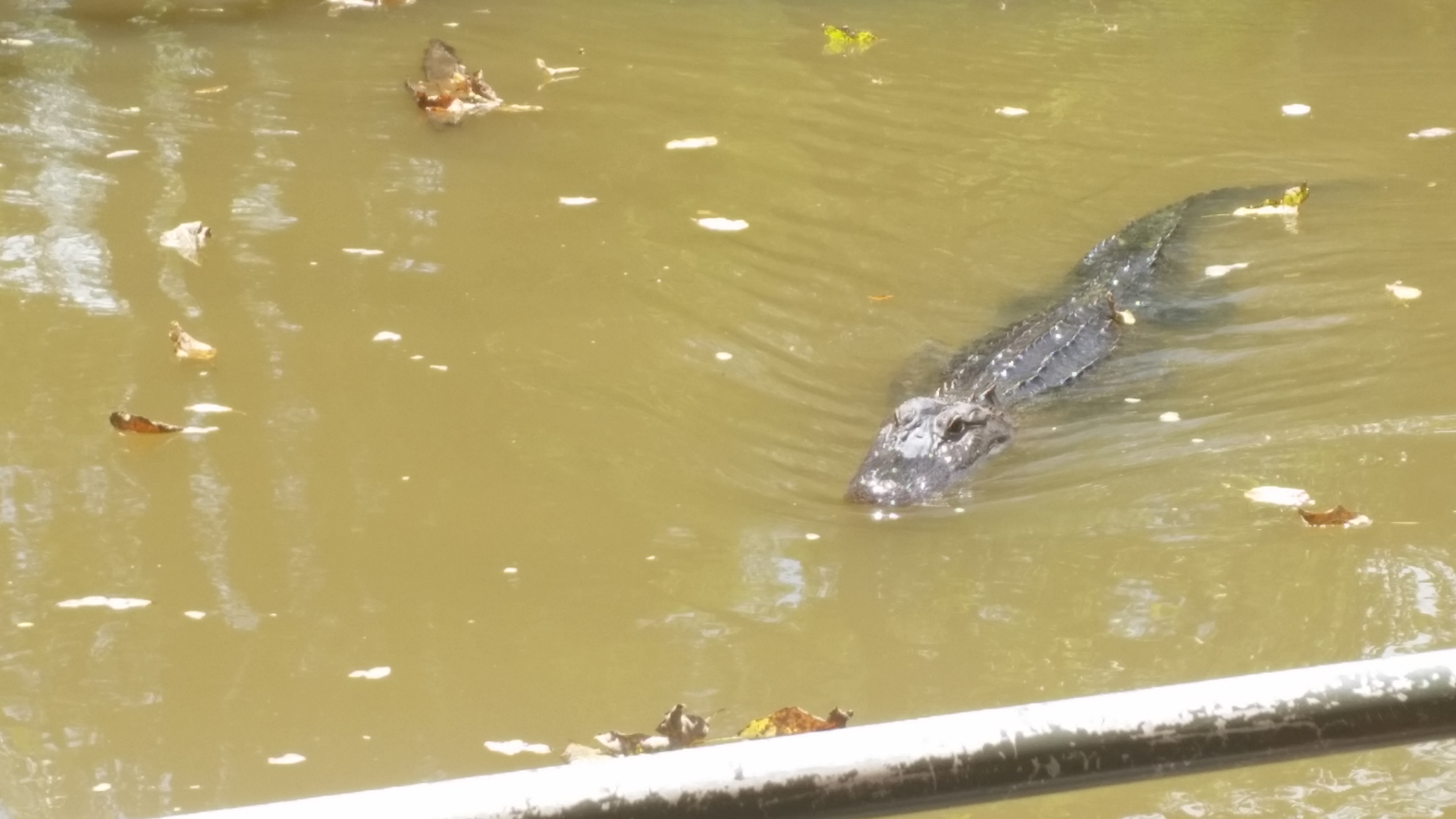
Gator in Louisiana bayou swims

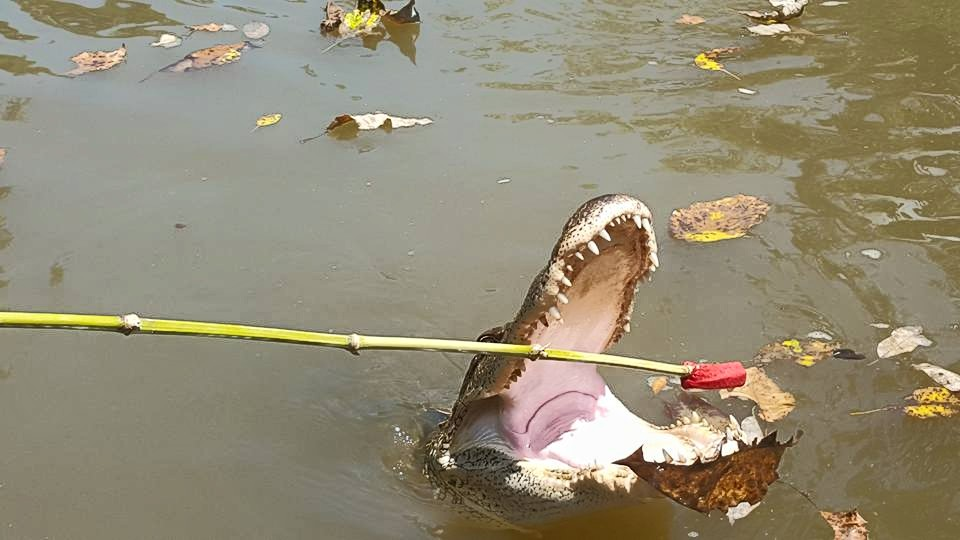
Gator in Louisiana bayou eats

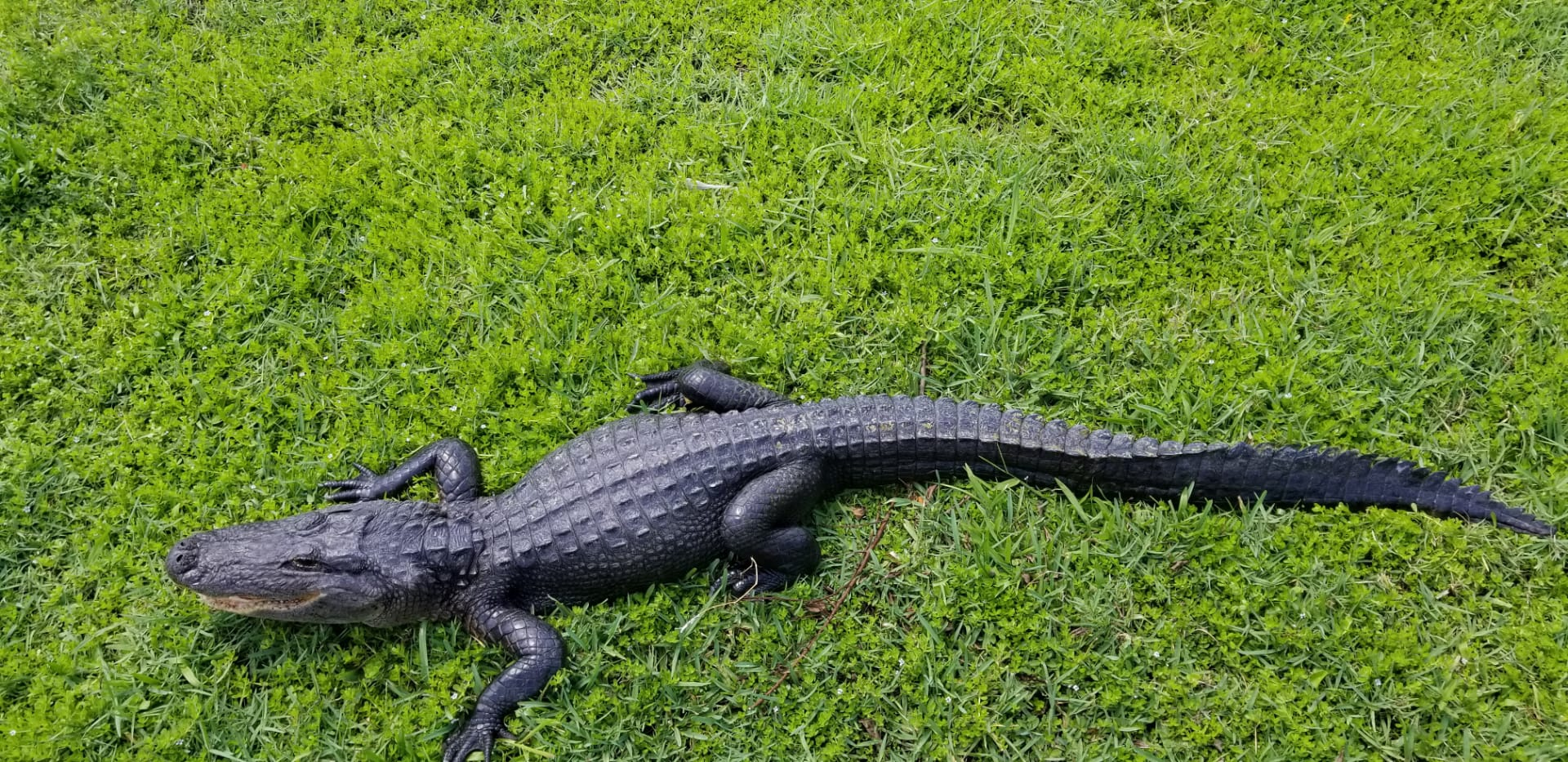
Juvenile alligator found in Everglades National Park

== See also ==
- Alligator farm
- Caiman
- Gharial
- List of fatal alligator attacks in the United States by decade
