= Little Lake Bonny =

Lake in Polk County, Florida

- Location of Little Lake Bonny in Florida Location of Little Lake Bonny in the USA
- Location: Lakeland, Polk County, Florida
- Coordinates: 28°1′58.9436″N 81°55′36.6359″W
- Basin countries: United States
- Surface area: 24 acres (0.097 km^{2})

Little Lake Bonny, (sometimes spelled Little Lake Bonnie) is a lake in Polk County, Florida, in the United States. It has a surface area of 24 acres (9.7 hectares). The lake is a part of the Peace River - Saddle Creek Watershed. The lake lies at the Southeast corner of the much larger Lake Bonny. Some believe these lakes derive their name from the bony fish caught in the lake, while others say the lake's name honors a local pioneer with the name Boney. The lake borders Southeastern University and the Lake-to-Lake Trail.

Little Lake Bonny is usually conjoined with Lake Bonny on its southeastern corner, except in periods of drought.
