= List of fatal alligator attacks in the United States =

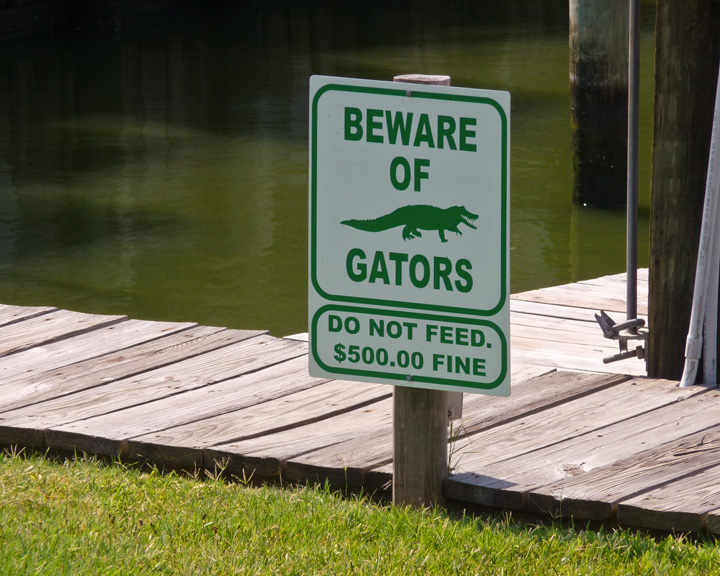
Warning sign, Texas

This is a list of fatal alligator attacks in the United States in reverse chronological order by decade. All occurred in the South, where alligators are endemic to wetlands and tidal marshes. The state of Florida, where most attacks and deaths occur, began keeping records of alligator attacks in 1948.

== 2020s ==
Date	Victim	Location — Circumstances
October 16, 2026	Steve Hamilton, 71, male	Florida, Orange County, Winter Garden - The victim was fishing on the shore of a small pond connected to Lake Apopka when he was pulled into the water by a large alligator. Later that day, officials captured and killed an 11 foot 8 inch alligator believed to have been responsible.
June 28, 2026	Brittany Clark, 31, female	Florida, Seminole County, near Oviedo, Econlockhatchee River — She was cooling off in a river in Little Big Econ State Forest near the Barr Street Trailhead after a hike and was attacked. Her arms were seriously injured and she died on the way to hospital.
August 14, 2025	Bryan Vasquez, 12, male	Louisiana, New Orleans — The victim's body was found by drone in a canal on August 28 (two weeks after he had gone missing). It was reported that the injuries leading to his death were "blunt trauma consistent with an alligator attack and subsequent drowning".
May 6, 2025	Cynthia Diekema, 61, female	Florida, Polk County, Tiger Creek, near Lake Kissimmee — The victim was canoeing with her husband in about 2.5 ft (0.76 m) of water when their canoe passed over a large alligator. The alligator thrashed and tipped the canoe over, throwing the couple into the water. The victim was subsequently bitten and pulled underwater by the alligator. Her body was later recovered from the water by authorities who captured two alligators that evening, one measuring 11 ft 4 in (3.45 m) long, and a second measuring approximately 10–11 ft (3.0–3.4 m) long.
September 23, 2023	Sabrina Peckham, 41, female	Florida, Pinellas County, Largo, near Clearwater — A witness spotted a large alligator with a human torso clenched in its jaws in an irrigation canal. The coroner determined the victim was attacked and partially eaten by a 13 ft 8 in (4.17 m) alligator after recovering several of her body parts from its stomach. Peckham was homeless, and had been trespassing on wetland property less than 1-mile (1.6 km) from where her remains were found. The alligator was killed by an officer. Sheriff's Deputies released body camera footage a few months after the incident.
July 4, 2023	Holly Jenkins, 69, female	South Carolina, Hilton Head Island — The victim was attacked and killed by an alligator as she was walking her dogs in her neighborhood of Spanish Wells. First responders were not immediately able to reach the victim because the alligator had crawled out of the water and was "guarding" her body.
February 20, 2023	Gloria Serge, 85, female	Florida, Fort Pierce — The victim was walking her dog next to a pond at the Spanish Lakes Fairways retirement community. The alligator first attacked the dog and when the woman tried to save the dog, she too was attacked. The dog survived.
August 15, 2022	Nancy Becker, 88, female	South Carolina — The victim was in her backyard in a gated Sun City community in Bluffton, and was attacked by a nearly 10 ft (3.0 m)-long alligator. The victim's body was found being guarded by the alligator and was later recovered.
July 15, 2022	Rose Marie Wiegand, 80, female	Florida, Englewood — The victim fell into a pond along a golf course and was attacked by two alligators.
June 24, 2022	Michael Burstein, 75, male	South Carolina, Myrtle Beach — The victim was dragged into a pond. The body was later recovered and a subsequent post-mortem established that Burstein had died of drowning.
May 31, 2022	Sean McGuinness, 47, male	Florida, Largo — The victim was attacked while trying to retrieve frisbee golf discs in the lake at John S. Taylor Park. Police believed McGuinness had entered the lake during nighttime hours, as his body did not appear to have been in the lake for a long period when a person walking their dog discovered it along the shoreline with its arm torn off around 8 a.m.
August 30, 2021	Timothy Satterlee, 71, male	Louisiana — The victim was attacked in floodwaters of Hurricane Ida near the city of Slidell, which is just across Lake Pontchartrain from New Orleans. The attack was witnessed by the victim's wife, who said the alligator bit his arm off. A 12 ft (3.7 m)-long alligator believed to have attacked Satterlee was captured and killed on September 13, 2021. Human remains were found in its stomach. Although Louisiana, like Florida, has approximately 1.5 million alligators, this was Louisiana's only known fatal alligator attack up to that time.
May 1, 2020	Cynthia Covert, 58, female	South Carolina — The victim was pulled under and drowned by an alligator in a pond behind a home near Salt Cedar Lane, Kiawah Island.

== 2010s ==
Date	Victim	Location — Circumstances
August 20, 2018	Cassandra Cline, 45, female	South Carolina — Dragged to her death while walking her dog near a golf course in the gated community of Sea Pines in Hilton Head. Witnesses said Cline was attempting to protect her dog when the alligator pulled her into a lagoon. The dog was unharmed.
June 8, 2018	Shizuka Matsuki, 47, female	Florida — Dragged to her death and dismembered while walking dogs at the Silver Lake Rotary Nature Park in Davie.
July 29, 2016	Bonnie Walker, 90, female	South Carolina — Walker's body was found in a retention pond near Brookdale Senior Living Center in Charleston. According to coroners, she died from "multiple sharp and blunt force injuries" that are consistent with those inflicted by an alligator.
June 14, 2016	Lane Graves, 2, male	Florida — An alligator, 4 to 7 feet (1.2 to 2.1 m) long, dragged the victim under water in the Seven Seas Lagoon about 9:00 p.m. on June 14, 2016, at Disney's Grand Floridian Resort & Spa just outside of Orlando. His parents tried to rescue him; the father was attacked by a second alligator. The victim's body was found nearby the next day, intact and apparently drowned.
June 5, 2016 (on or about)	Richard Zachary Taylor, 72, male	Florida — Police recovered Taylor's body after a report of an alligator with a body in its mouth near Lake Hunter in Lakeland. A trapper responded a short time later and eventually caught the alligator. Detectives do not know whether Taylor drowned or was killed by the reptile. His body was decomposed, indicating he had been in the water a couple of days or longer. Remains found inside the alligator during a necropsy were a match to Taylor.
November 13, 2015 (on or about)	Matthew Riggins, 22, male	Florida — A police dive team found the victim's body in a pond in Micco Barefoot Bay community in Brevard County ten days after he was reported missing. Riggins, who had been burglarizing homes in the area, was attacked and partially eaten by an 11-foot (3.4-meter) alligator.
October 19, 2015	James Okkerse, 62, male	Florida — Okkerse was killed while swimming/snorkeling by a 12-foot (3.7-meter) alligator at Blue Spring State Park near Orange City. The final cause of death was determined by the Volusia County medical examiner's office in consultation with a forensic odontologist from a neighboring county who specializes in animal bites.
July 4, 2015	Tommie Woodward, 28, male	Texas — After an 11-foot (3.4 m) alligator appeared at Burkarts Marina in Orange bystanders were told to stay out of the water. Tommie Woodward mocked the alligator and jumped into the water in close proximity to the alligator and was immediately pulled underwater; his body was later found with severe trauma to the chest. This was the first recorded fatal alligator attack in Texas since 1836.

== 2000s ==
Date	Victim	Location — Circumstances
November 13, 2007	Justo Padron, 36, male	Florida — A man fleeing police by jumping into a retention pond adjacent to the Miccosukee Resort and Convention Center near Miami was killed by a 9-foot-3-inch (2.82 m) alligator.
October 5, 2007	Gwen Williams, 83, female	Georgia — A Canadian woman who had been house sitting for her daughter at The Landings on Skidaway Island, east of Savannah, was spotted floating in a lagoon 500 feet (150 m) behind her daughter's house. Autopsy results and a necropsy of the animal established that she had been attacked and killed by an 8-foot (2.4 m) alligator.
May 14, 2006	Annemarie Campbell, 23, female	Florida — Her body was pulled out of an alligator's mouth by friends and relatives in a springhead at Juniper Wayside Park in the Ocala National Forest near Lake George in Marion County. She had been attacked while snorkeling. Autopsy results confirmed that Campbell died from drowning and multiple blunt-force injuries including lacerations on her head, neck and upper torso, and multiple rib fractures. Officials later captured and killed an 12-foot-4-inch (3.76 m), 407-pound (185 kg) alligator that they were able to positively identify as the one that attacked Campbell due to scratches around its eyes that she inflicted while attempting to defend herself.
May 14, 2006	Judy W. Cooper, 43, female	Florida — Her body was found in a canal near Oldsmar in Pinellas County, 20 miles (32 km) north of St. Petersburg. She had been in the water for about three days. Preliminary autopsy results indicated a fatal alligator attack. Her arm and hand were later recovered from an 8.5-foot (2.6 m) alligator.
May 10, 2006	Yovy Suarez Jiménez, 28, female	Florida — Her dismembered body was found floating in a canal between Markham County Park and State Road 84 in Sunrise. She was killed while jogging the previous evening by a 9-foot-6-inch (2.90 m) alligator; her arms were found in the animal's digestive tract during necropsy. and the Broward County medical examiner concluded that she was attacked on land and dragged into the canal.
July 15, 2005	Kevin Albert Murray, 41, male	Florida — He was killed while swimming in the Apollo waterway in Port Charlotte by a 12-foot-2-inch (3.71 m) alligator.
March 15, 2005	Don Owen, 56, male	Florida — Fishermen discovered Owen's body about 12 miles (19 km) from his Lakeland home. He had been missing since March 9. Trappers later caught an 8 ft 9 in (2.67 m) alligator and recovered some of Owen's body parts.
September 26, 2004	Michelle Reeves, 20, female	Florida — She was killed by a 7-foot-11-inch (2.41 m) alligator while swimming in a retention pond at Lee Memorial Health Park in Lee County.
June 21, 2004	Janie Melsek, 54, female	Florida — She was attacked by a 12-foot-3-inch (3.73 m) alligator while working on landscaping along Poinciana Circle Sanibel. She later died in surgery from an infection acquired from being in the water with open wounds.
June 18, 2003	Brian Griffin, 12, male	Florida — He was killed by a 10-foot-4-inch (3.15 m) alligator while swimming in the Dead River near a boat ramp; the river connects Lakes Harris and Eustis in Lake County.
September 11, 2001	Robert Steele, 81, male	Florida — He was attacked by an alligator while walking his dog on a trail between two wetland areas near the J. N. "Ding" Darling National Wildlife Refuge on Sanibel, Florida. Steele bled to death after his leg was bitten off below the knee.
June 23, 2001	Alexandria Murphy, 2, female	Florida — She wandered away from her fenced back yard and was killed 700 feet (210 m) from her home on Lake Cannon in Winter Haven.
May 4, 2001	Samuel Wetmore, 70, male	Florida — He was killed in a pond near his residence in Venice, Sarasota County by an 8 ft 4 in (2.54 m) alligator. Wetmore suffered from dementia and had wandered from his home.

== 1990s ==
Date	Victim	Location — Circumstances
November 7, 1998	Quatisha Maycock, 5, female	Florida — After he was paroled from an attempted murder conviction, Harrel Franklin Braddy choked a woman that rejected his advances unconscious and abducted her daughter, Maycock. He deliberately abandoned Maycock near a body of water in an everglade area known to be infested with alligators, and she was attacked and killed by an alligator. Her body was discovered two days after the abduction by a pair of fishermen. According to autopsy reports, Maycock suffered blunt trauma to the head and torso, and her left arm was torn off by a bite. For orchestrating the fatal attack, Braddy was initially sentenced to death by the state of Florida, but Florida Supreme Court justices vacated the death sentence in 2017. He was resentenced to life imprisonment in a retrial that concluded in 2026.
March 21, 1997	Adam Binford, 3, male	Florida — He was killed by an 11-foot (3.4 m) alligator after straying outside a roped-off area in Lake Ashby, Volusia County. Wildlife officials shot the alligator, which was still holding the lifeless body of the boy 20 hours later.
October 3, 1993	Grace Eberhart, 70, female	Florida — She was killed by one or more alligators at Lake Serenity, Sumter County. She died of a broken neck caused by an alligator bite to the throat and head.
June 19, 1993	Bradley Weidenhamer, 10, male	Florida — He was killed while wading in the Loxahatchee River at Jonathan Dickinson State Park in Martin County.

== 1980s ==
Date	Victim	Location — Circumstances
June 4, 1988	Erin Glover, 4, female	Florida — She was killed while walking along the shore of Hidden Lake, Charlotte County.
July 13, 1987	George Cummings III, 29, male	Florida — He was killed while snorkeling in the Wakulla Springs State Park, Wakulla County by an 11-foot (3.4 m) alligator.
May 4, 1985	Paul Mirabito, 27, male	Florida — He was killed while diving and harassing small alligators in a canal near West Palm Beach.
August 6, 1984	Robert Crespo, 11, male	Florida — He was killed by a 12-foot-4-inch (3.76 m) alligator while swimming in a canal in St. Lucie County.

== 1970s ==
Date	Victim	Location — Circumstances
September 10, 1978	Phillip Rastrelli, 14, male	Florida — He was killed while swimming across the Hidden River Canal off Bessie Creek in Martin County.
September 28, 1977	George Leonard, 52, male	Florida — He was killed while swimming in the Peace River Canal, Charlotte County.
August 16, 1973	Sharon Holmes, 16, female	Florida — She was killed while swimming at the Oscar Scherer State Park, Sarasota County, by an 11 ft 3 in (3.43 m) alligator.

== 1950s ==
Date	Victim	Location — Circumstances
June 1957	Allen Rice, 9, male	Florida — He had been missing several days from his Eau Gallie home, when his body was discovered by the Civil Air Patrol on the banks of Horse Creek, and parts of his body were found inside an alligator destroyed by authorities.

== Pre-1900 ==
Date	Victim	Location — Circumstances
August 1899	Delano Wood, male	Florida — A 16-year-old was attacked by an alligator while swimming in a creek near Jacksonville. He managed to swim out of the creek but died on the shore.
April or June 1836	Gray B. King, male	Texas — A settler from Nashville traveling with his family and slaves was seized and pulled under by an alligator after jumping into the river to push free a ferry which had run aground. Sources describe the location as Double Bay (just below Anahuac), Buffalo Bayou, or the Trinity River.
June 7, 1816	Anna Retley	Gum Swamp near Lumberton, North Carolina — An 11-foot (3.4 m) alligator attacked Retley's horse or mule and then her; she died from her injuries three days later.
August 10, 1734	Jacques du Bois, male	Louisiana — The blacksmith at Fort St. Jean Baptiste, near what is now Natchitoches was found dead on the banks of the Cane River, and a coroner's inquest concluded he was killed by an alligator.
1685	Dumesnil, male	Texas — A slave of René-Robert Cavelier, Sieur de La Salle was killed while swimming across the Colorado River.

== See also ==
- CrocBITE
- List of crocodile attacks

Other species:

- List of fatal bear attacks in North America
- List of fatal cougar attacks in North America
- List of fatal snake bites in the United States
- List of fatal shark attacks in the United States
- List of wolf attacks in North America
- Fatal dog attacks in the United States
