= Alligator luicus =

Alligator luicus Temporal range: Middle Miocene

Scientific classification
- Kingdom: Animalia
- Phylum: Chordata
- Class: Reptilia
- Clade: Archosauria
- Order: Crocodilia
- Family: Alligatoridae
- Genus: Alligator
- Species: †A. luicus

Binomial name
- †Alligator luicus Li & Wang, 1987

Extinct species of alligator

Alligator luicus is an extinct species of alligator that lived in what is now Shandong, China during the Middle Miocene.

== History ==
A nearly complete alligator skull was discovered in the Shanwang Formation in 1984, and described as A. luicus in 1987 by Jinling Li and Baozhong Wang.

== Description ==
The skull appears to belong to a juvenile individual, as it resembles juveniles of the related Chinese alligator (A. sinensis). However, the snout, which was measured at 50 mm (2.0 in) in length, is wider than it is long in A. luicus as opposed to what is seen in an A. sinensis individual of the same size.
