= Lake Parker (Florida) =

Lake in Florida, United States

- Location within Florida Location within the United States
- Location: Lakeland, Polk County, Florida
- Coordinates: 28°04′04″N 81°55′36″W
- Primary outflows: Roaring Brook
- Basin countries: United States
- Surface area: 2,181.01 acres (8.8262 km^{2})
- Max. depth: 20 ft (6.1 m)

Lake Parker is a lake located on the northeast side of the city of Lakeland, Florida. It is the largest lake in the city of Lakeland. The lake is relatively shallow with an average depth of 5 feet (1.5 m). The lake has inflow from several lakes in Lakeland including Lake Mirror and Lake Bonny. Lake Parker outflows to both Saddle Creek and the Peace River making the lake important for ecological reasons. To control hydrilla various pesticides are utilized.

The lake bears the name of Streaty Parker, a pioneer settler.

== Recreation ==
Lake Parker is one of the more popular lakes in Lakeland for recreational use, particularly for fishing and boating. There are three boat ramps and two fishing piers around the lake for those purposes. The lake is well stocked with Largemouth bass, bluegill, and crappie. There is also a path around a portion of the lake and a few parks located on or near the lake. The Lake-to-Lake Trail starts here and continues through downtown Lakeland, ending at Lake John.
