= Alligator hailensis =

Alligator hailensis Temporal range: Early Pleistocene-2 Ma

Scientific classification
- Kingdom: Animalia
- Phylum: Chordata
- Class: Reptilia
- Order: Crocodylia
- Family: Alligatoridae
- Genus: Alligator
- Species: †A. hailensis

Binomial name
- †Alligator hailensis Stout, 2020

Extinct species of alligator

Alligator hailensis, or Haile alligator, is a large, extinct species of Alligator known from the early Pleistocene of Florida. It is named after the Haile Quarry site, where it was found. Its age and skeletal morphology is intermediate between the geologically older Alligator mefferdi and the modern American alligator, making it a transitional fossil.

== History and naming ==
The remains of Alligator hailensis were found in the Haile 7C and 7G fossil sites, late Blancan assemblages from Alachua County, Florida, likely representing water-filled sinkholes that were covered in sediments. These fossil localities yielded a minimum of forty-three individual alligators, possibly even more, bridging the gap between species from the Pliocene and the modern American alligator. Out of these, specimen UF 224688, a complete skull with mandible and assorted postcranial remains ranging from vertebrae to limb bones, was chosen as the holotype. The specific name hailensis is derived from the name of the fossil sites.

== Description ==
The Haile alligator was a large animal, comparable to the modern Mississippi alligator in size,which would make Alligator hailensis up to 4.5 metres (15 ft) in length with the holotype skull measuring 52.5 cm (20.7 in) from the tip of the snout to the end of the parietal bone and 15 cm (5.9 in) across the widest point of the maxilla. A larger, tho less complete specimen even measures up to 20 cm (7.9 in) across the maxilla. nares of the animal are oval in shape and is almost split in two by the nasal bones, which extend significantly into the nares. Dorsally the processes of the premaxilla extend only to the first maxillary tooth, which is notably shorter than in either the extant American alligator or specimens tentatively referred to Alligator cf. mefferdi. The upper jaw contains five premaxillary teeth and sixteen maxillary teeth, rounded in cross section and conical in the front, while teeth further back show slight compression. The mandible contains twenty-one teeth, the fourth being the largest of the tooth row. The orbits are rounded towards the rear with straight ventral margins that narrow to a point towards the front of the skull. The rims of the orbits, as in other alligator species, are raised above the skull table. The frontal bone and parietal meet just behind the orbits, separated from one another by a straight suture. The supratemporal fenestrae are rounded, giving the parietal an hourglass shape. The axial and epaxial skeleton are largely similar to other species of alligators, however Alligator hailensis stands out as being known from much more material than other extinct members of the genus across various age groups. Much like other alligators, A. hailensis lacked osteoderms on its belly. The species differs from A. mefferdi in the placement of the suture between pterygoid and palatine, which is situated before the rear edge of the suborbital fenestra. From the modern alligator it differs in the extent of the splenial, which in A. hailensis makes up around forty percent of the medial wall of the mandibular toothrow. Additionally, it differs from any other species of alligator through the presence of an anterior foramen intermandibularis oralis (a foramen located on the anterior end of the splenial) which is incompletely closed. In modern species, the Chinese alligator possesses this foramen while the American alligator lacks this feature.

== Evolution ==
Both in regards to morphology and chronology, the Haile alligator forms an intermediate form between Alligator mefferdi from the Miocene-Pliocene and the modern American alligator. The appearance of Alligator hailensis in early Pleistocene sediments matches with the first remains of Alligator mississippiensis being found in localities dating to the middle Pleistocene and later. Additionally, the geography of Alligator hailensis is consistent with the genus modern range being largely restricted to the south-eastern United States, while A. mefferdi was found in Nebraska (although Miocene records of Florida might be referable to the species) and even older taxa indicate that the genus originated in the American Midwest. Stout acknowledges that one could argue that the Haile alligator may represent a glimpse into the anagenetic evolution of modern alligators, however maintains that the remains are morphologically distinct enough to warrant the creation of a functional species. The plurality consensus tree recovered by Stout is shown below.

- Alligator
  - †A. prenasalis
  - - †A. mcgrewi
    - - †A. olseni
      - - A. sinensis Chinese alligator
        - - †A thomsoni
          - - †A. mefferdi
            - - †A. hailensis
              - A. mississippiensis American alligator

== Paleobiology ==
In addition to both cranial and postcranial remains, researchers also discovered multiple coprolites (fossilized feces) at the Haile fossil site. These coprolites are consistent in shape with those of crocodilians and were thus assumed to be those of Alligator hailensis. Encased in the fossil were remains identified to belong to fish, indicating that at least some part of the Haile alligator's diet consisted of fish.
