= Lake Hollingsworth =

Lake in Florida, United States

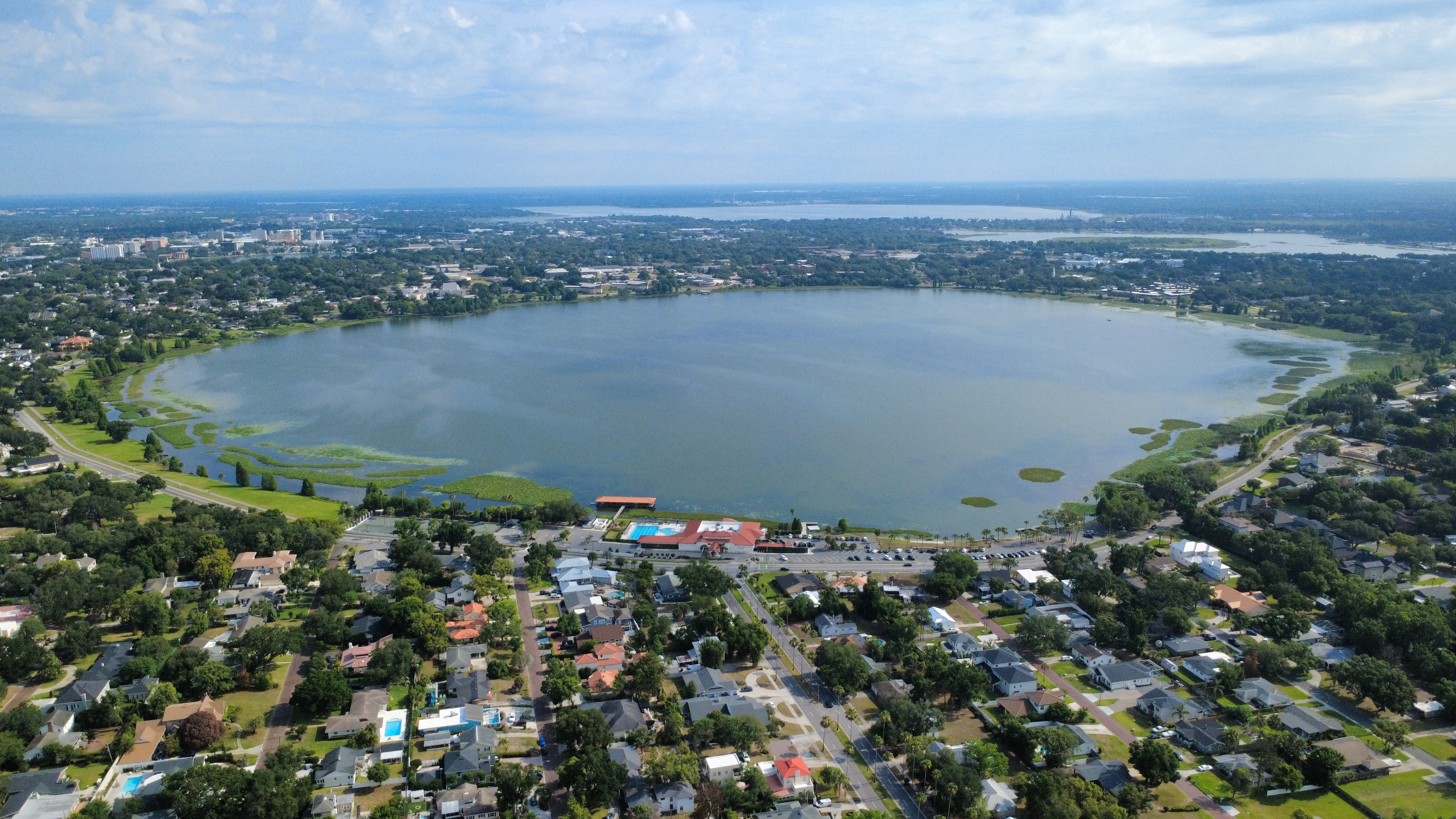
- Aerial view of Lake Hollingsworth in Lakeland, Florida, photographed from the south on May 10, 2026.

- Location within Florida
- Location: Lakeland, Polk County, Florida
- Coordinates: 28°01′26″N 81°56′39″W
- Primary outflows: Peace River, Saddle Creek
- Basin countries: United States
- Surface area: 350 acres (1.4 km^{2})
- Settlements: Lakeland, Florida

Lake Hollingsworth is a lake located near the center of the City of Lakeland, Florida. Its area is 350 acres (1.4 km^{2}). The lake is located just east of South Florida Avenue and west of Bartow Road. Lake Hollingsworth Drive and a path for biking and walking known as the Lake-to-Lake Trail are located along the entire circumference of the lake.

Florida Southern College is located on the north side of the lake, and from the path, an observer can see several of the buildings on campus designed by famed architect Frank Lloyd Wright. The lake is also a popular site for birdwatching, and some of the most commonly seen birds are roseate spoonbills, white pelicans, black-bellied plovers, and long-billed dowitchers.

Lake Hollingsworth bears the name of John Henry Hollingsworth, a pioneer who settled there.
