= Lake-to-Lake Trail =

Trail network in Lakeland, Florida

Coordinates: 28.0429°N 81.9436°W

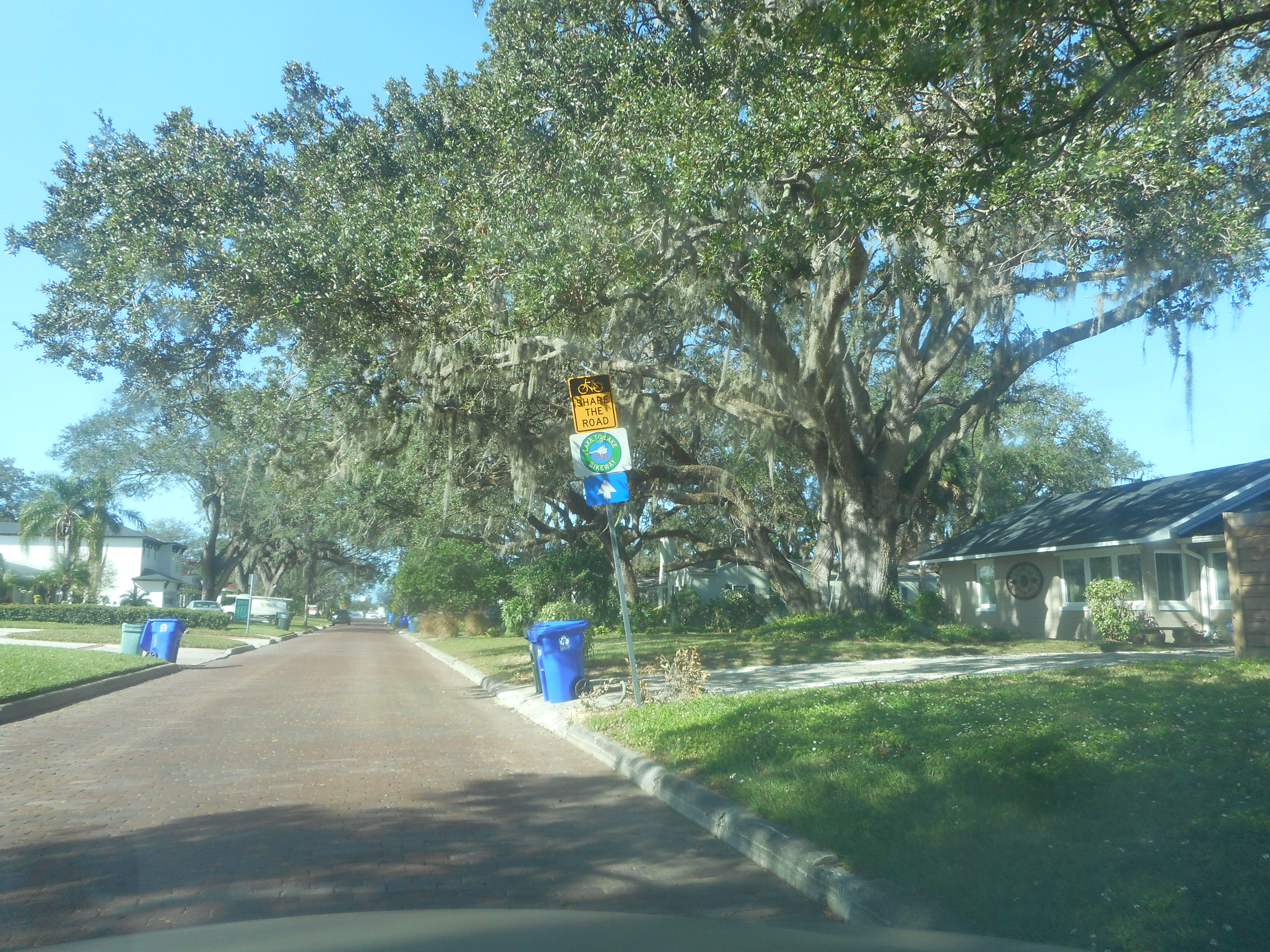
- Part of the Lake-to-Lake Bikeway along Easton Drive in Lakeland; December 2022.
- Location: Lakeland, Florida, United States
- Trailheads: Lake John; Lake Hollingsworth; Lake Mirror; Lake Parker Recreation Area
- Difficulty: easy
- Season: Year round
- Surface: Asphalt, concrete

The Lake-to-Lake Trail is an urban 26 miles (42 km) network of paved multi-use paths that runs between numerous lakes in Lakeland, Florida. The southern terminus of the trail can be accessed from the shores of Lake John. From there, the trail circles Lake Hollingsworth, running by Florida Southern College, then travels west through downtown Lakeland and by Lake Hunter, Lake Beulah, Lake Wire, Lake Mirror, Lake Morton, Lake Bonny, where it passes by Southeastern University, and finally winds up along Lake Parker. The city considers Lake Mirror to be the "hub" of the trail.
