= Tiger Creek (Florida) =

River in the United States of America

- Location within Florida Location within the United States

Physical characteristics
- Source
  - coordinates: 27.8744693°N 81.507297°W
- Mouth
  - coordinates: 27.8086377°N 81.4367400°W

Tiger Creek is a stream in Polk County, Florida, in the United States.

Tiger Creek was named from the fact Florida panthers were seen there by early settlers.
