= Lake Hunter Terrace Historic District =

Historic district in Florida, United States

- U.S. National Register of Historic Places
- U.S. Historic district
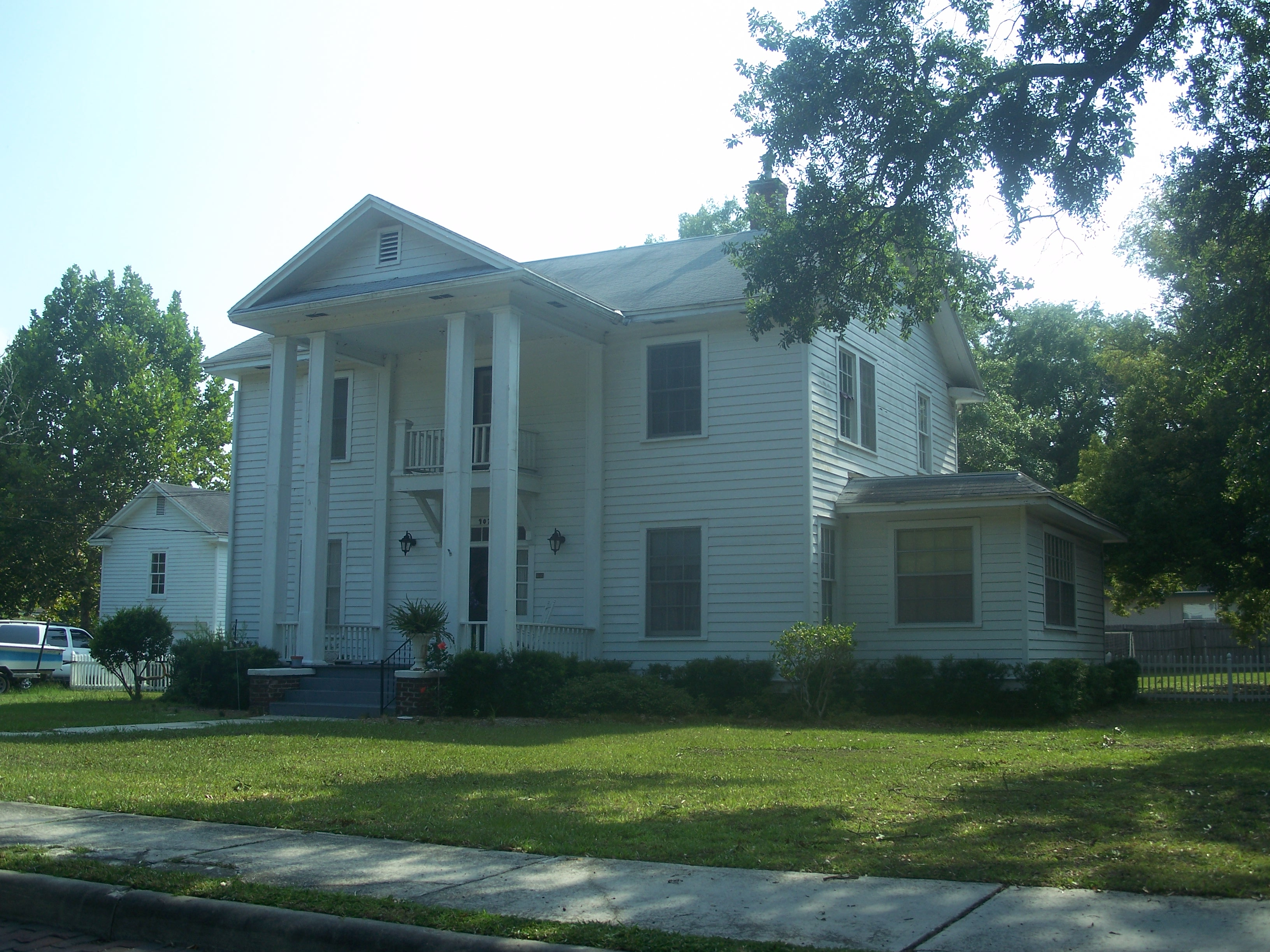

- Location within Florida Location within the United States
- Location: Lakeland, Florida
- Coordinates: 28°2′8″N 81°58′14″W
- Area: 650 acres (2.6 km^{2})
- NRHP reference No.: 02001536
- Added to NRHP: December 20, 2002

The Lake Hunter Terrace Historic District is a U.S. historic district (designated as such on December 20, 2002) located in Lakeland, Florida. The district is bounded by roughly Central Avenue, Greenwood Street, Ruby Street, and Sikes Boulevard. It contains 163 historic buildings.
