= Lake Hunter =

- Location within Florida
- Location: south of Lakeland, Florida
- Coordinates: 28.0330°N 81.9660°W
- Type: natural freshwater lake
- Basin countries: United States
- Max. length: 3,250 feet (990 m)
- Max. width: 2,070 feet (630 m)
- Surface area: 93 acres (38 ha)
- Average depth: 5.6 feet (1.7 m)
- Max. depth: 8.9 feet (2.7 m)
- Water volume: 178,620,197 US gallons (676,151,000 L)
- Surface elevation: 161.75 feet (49.30 m)

Lake Hunter, a pear-shaped lake, has a surface area of 93 acres (380,000 m^{2}). This lake is inside Lakeland, Florida, and the area surrounding it is completely urbanized. It is bordered on the northeast by residences and the Lake Hunter Boat Ramp. On the lakes's north and west it is bordered by Sikes Boulevard and on the south and southeast by Lake Hunter Drive. The Lake Hunter Terrace Historic District borders the lake along Sikes Boulevard.

Lake Hunter provides public access along most of its shore, since a public sidewalk travels three-fourths of the way around it. Also, the Lake Hunter Boat Ramp is a public boat ramp. There are no swimming beaches along the lake's shore. This lake contains largemouth bass and bluegill.

On June 7, 2016, the body of a dead man was found in the mouth of an alligator on the shore of Lake Hunter. When officials arrived at the scene, the alligator let go of the body and swam away, police said. At the time, it wasn't known if the alligator killed the person or simply found the dead body.

Lake Hunter bears the name of one Mr. Hunter, who often visited the lake in earlier days.
