= Bonny Lake (Florida) =

Lake in the state of Florida, United States

Lake Bonny
- Location of Bonny Lake in Florida Location of Bonny Lake in the USA
- Location: Lakeland, Polk County, Florida
- Coordinates: 28°2′22″N 81°55′37″W
- Basin countries: United States
- Surface area: 249 acres (1.01 km^{2})
- Average depth: 3 ft (0.91 m)
- Max. depth: 11 ft (3.4 m)
- Water volume: 389,902,099 US gal (1.476×10^{6} m^{3}; 1,197 acre⋅ft)

Lake Bonny, (sometimes spelled Lake Bonnie) is a lake in Polk County, Florida, in the United States. It has a surface area of 249 acres (101 hectares), a mean depth of 3 feet (0.91 m) and a maximum depth of 11 feet (3.4 m). The lake is a part of the Peace River - Saddle Creek Watershed.

Some believe the Bonny Lake derives its name from the bony fish caught in the lake, while others say the lake's name honors a local pioneer with the name Boney. The lake borders the 113 acre Lake Bonny Park, Bonny Shores Mobile Home Park, Southeastern University and the Lake-to-Lake Trail. In 2013, the city of Lakeland opened Lakeland Skatepark, a $1.3 million state-of-the-art skate facility at Lake Bonny Park, which has been used in photo shoots by Nike and other national advertisers. The skate park won the "Build It" award from the American Planning Association's Florida chapter.

== Little Lake Bonny ==
The lake is usually conjoined with Little Lake Bonny on its southeastern corner, except in periods of drought.
