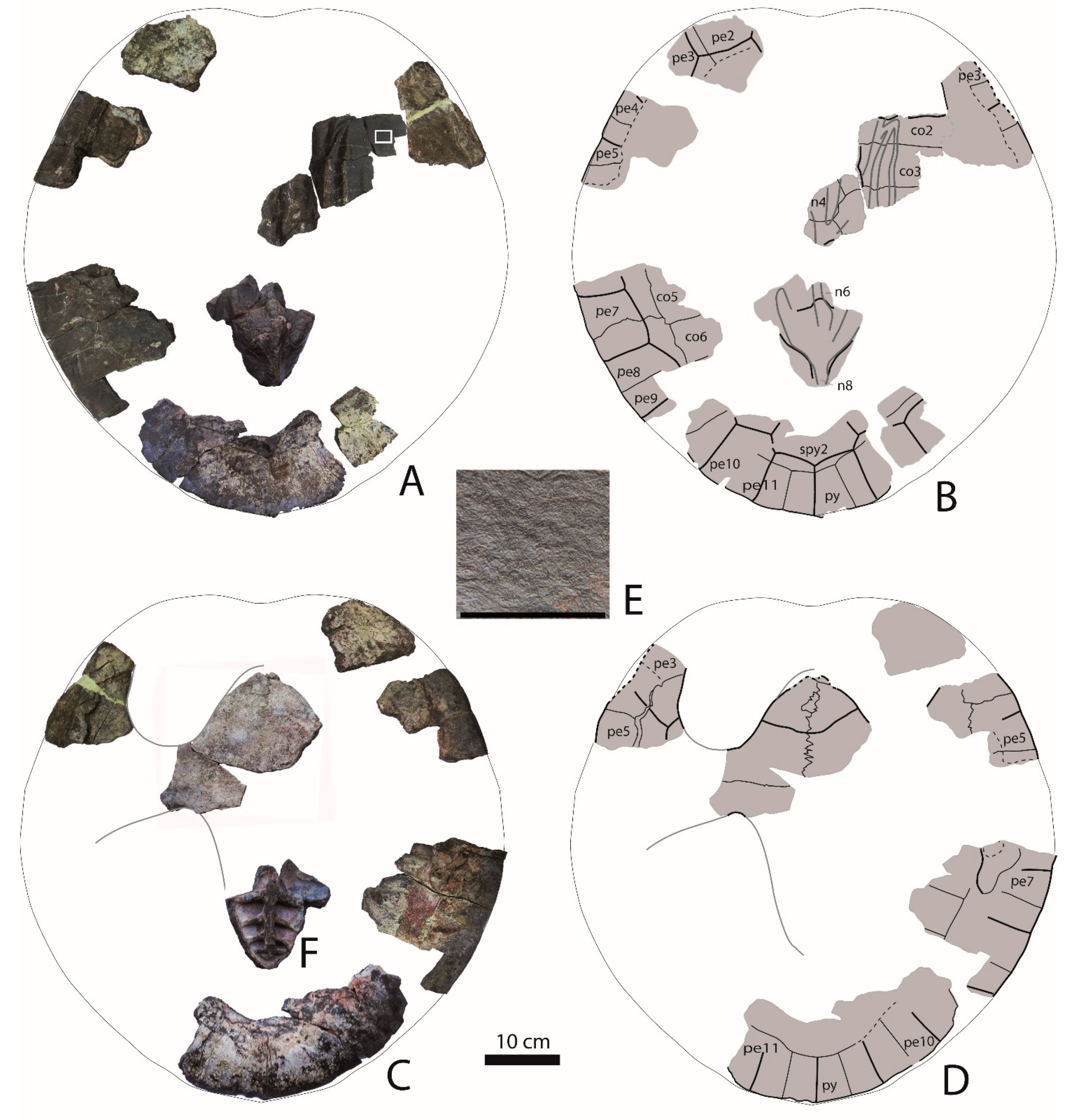
- Holotype carapace remains of Yakemys multiporcata

Scientific classification
- Kingdom: Animalia
- Phylum: Chordata
- Class: Reptilia
- Clade: Pantestudines
- Clade: Testudinata
- Family: †Macrobaenidae
- Genus: †Yakemys; Tong et al., 2021

Type species
- †Yakemys multiporcata Tong et al., 2021

= Yakemys =

Yakemys Temporal range: Berriasian

Extinct genus of turtles

Yakemys is an extinct genus of macrobaenid turtles from the Late Jurassic-Early Cretaceous (Tithonian-Valanginian?) lower Phu Kradung Formation of Thailand. It is monotypic, containing a single species, Yakemys multiporcata.

== Discovery and etymology ==
Yakemys hails from fossil turtle site Ban Huai Yang (บ้านห้วยยาง) of Northeast Thailand, which, although expected to be within the later Phra Wihan Formation based on its geographic location, is thought to instead belong to the Phu Kradung Formation based on sedimentology. The recovered holotype of Yakemys multiporcata SM KS39 (housed in the Sirindhorn Museum) consists of a very partial shell, and the paratypes are PRC 151, PRC 152, and PRC 153, each one or two shell fragments from different individuals. Its genus name is derived from ยักษ์ (yak), meaning "giant" in Thai, and its specific name from the Latin "multus" (multiple) and "porca" (ridge).

== Description ==
Yakemys is one of the earliest macrobaenids known, and one of the three largest, with a carapace length of 70 cm (2.3 ft), equaling Anatolemys maximus and Judithemys backmani from the Late Cretaceous and Paleocene. It can be distinguished by these autapomorphies: narrow vertebral scutes, large lateral longitudinal keels on the vertebral region, a plastron greatly reduced in size compared to the carapace, among other traits.

== Classification ==
Yakemys was found by phylogenetic analysis in Tong et al. (2021) to belong to Macrobaenidae, and they suggested that Sinemydidae is a subfamily of Macrobaenidae, becoming Sinemydinae. The results of the analysis are shown below:

- Testudines
  - - †Platychelyidae
    - Pleurodira
  - - †
      - Angolachelonia
        - Solnhofia
        - - Santanachelys
          - Thalassochelydia
      - - Xinjiangchelyidae
        - Macrobaenidae
          - - Liaochelys
            - Ordosemys
          - - Macrobaena
            - Yakemys
          - - Changmachelys
            - - Kirgizemys
              - Judithemys
          - Sinemydinae
            - Xiaochelys
            - - Manchurochelys
              - - Dracochelys
                - Sinemys
    - Cryptodira
