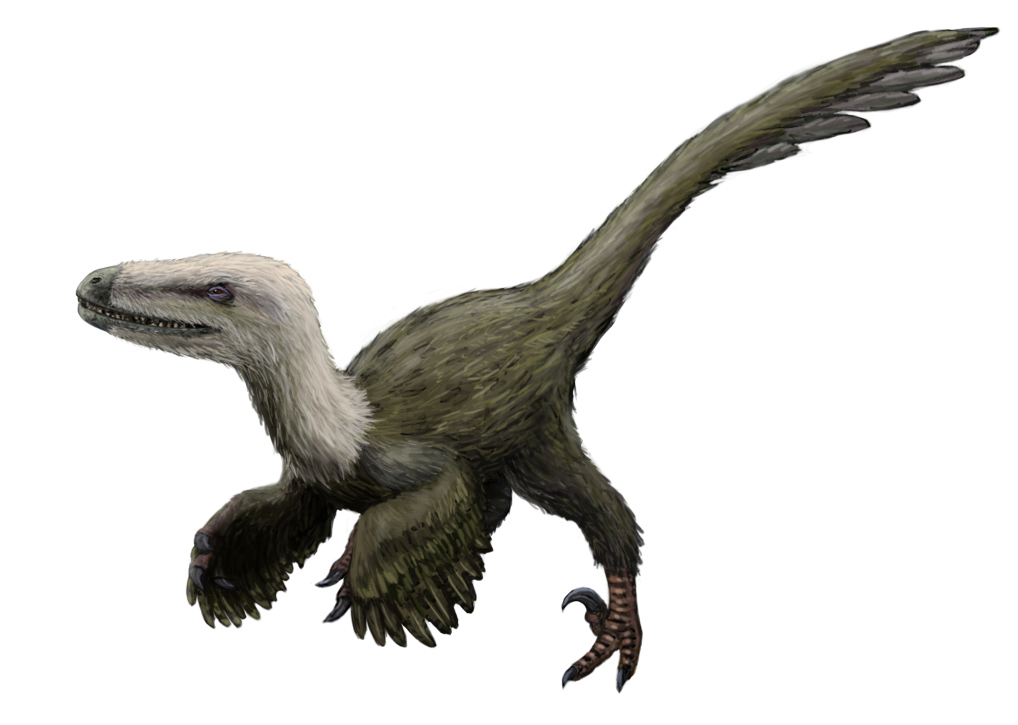
- Life reconstruction of Kansaignathus

Scientific classification
- Kingdom: Animalia
- Phylum: Chordata
- Class: Reptilia
- Clade: Dinosauria
- Clade: Saurischia
- Clade: Theropoda
- Family: †Dromaeosauridae
- Clade: †Eudromaeosauria
- Subfamily: †Velociraptorinae
- Genus: †Kansaignathus; Averianov & Lopatin, 2021

Type species
- †Kansaignathus sogdianus Averianov & Lopatin, 2021

= Kansaignathus =

Kansaignathus Temporal range: Late Cretaceous (Santonian), 86.3–83.6 Ma

Extinct genus of dinosaurs

Kansaignathus (/ˌkɛnsɑːiˈnɛiθəs/) is an extinct genus of dromaeosaurid theropod from the Late Cretaceous Yalovach Formation (or Ialovachsk Formation) of Tajikistan. The genus contains only one species, the type species, K. sogdianus. The generic name of Kansaignathus comes from near the town of Konsoy ("Kansai" in Russian) where it was discovered and the Greek word "gnathos" meaning "jaw". The specific epithet "sogdianus" is derived from the historical region of Sogdiana, which was an ancient name for the Fergana Valley region where the fossil was discovered. Kansaignathus is known from a single right dentary bone and a few post-cranial bone fragments. It was the first, and so far the only, dinosaur from Tajikistan to be described and named.

== Discovery ==
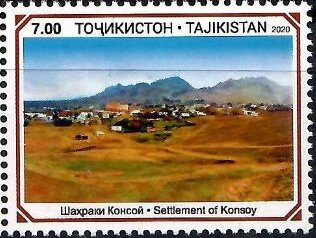
A stamp from Tajikistan depicting the town of Konsoy

The holotype of Kansaignathus was found at the Kansai locality, about 22 km to the North of the town of Khujand (sometimes spelled "Khudzhand") in the Sughd Region of Tajikistan. This locality was discovered in 1940 by O.S. Vialov, but fossils were not excavated from the area until the Paleontological Institute of the Academy of Sciences of the USSR sent large-scale expeditions to the area in 1963 and 1964. Exact dates and times of when the holotype was excavated is not known, but references to dromaeosaurs known from the locality were made by L.A. Nesov in a publication in 1995.

The type specimen is reposited at the Borissiak Paleontological Institute at the Russian Academy of Sciences in Moscow. It was given the designation PIN 2398/15 and consists of a single partial dentary bone. Additional material, which was also collected in the 1963-1964 expeditions, was described by A.K. Rozhdestvensky in 1977.

This additional material included PIN 2398/16 and 2398/1 (fragments of a sacrum), PIN 2398/4 and 2398/17 (two ungual phalanges), PIN 2398/18 (a manual ungual), and PIN 2398/19 (a fragmentary metatarsal). This material was referred to the new genus in January 2023 by the same authors who described the holotype. A dorsal vertebra found in association with these specimens was previously considered to belong to Kansaignathus, but is now believed to belong to a crocodyliform.

== Description ==
Kansaignathus is a small-bodied dromaeosaur which was probably similar in size to Velociraptor. The authors of its description estimate that it was probably about 2 metres (6.6 ft) long, which is similar to size estimates for Velociraptor and Dineobellator.

In their description of the holotype, Averianov and Lopatin distinguish Kansaignathus from other dromaeosaurs by the presence of several autapomorphies. It has a thin and deep profile of the dentary, parallel edges along the dentary's length (rather than tapering towards the front of the snout), a facet on the posterior-ventral process of the dentary to articulate with the splenial bone, two rows of vascular foramina on the outside edge of the jawbone, and interdental plates which have merged completely with the jaw.

The additional post-cranial material described by the authors in their subsequent publication was not included as part of the holotype specimen. However, the authors are confident in their assignment of the material to the same genus, and the anatomical characters from this material is used in their phylogenetic analysis.

=== Skull ===
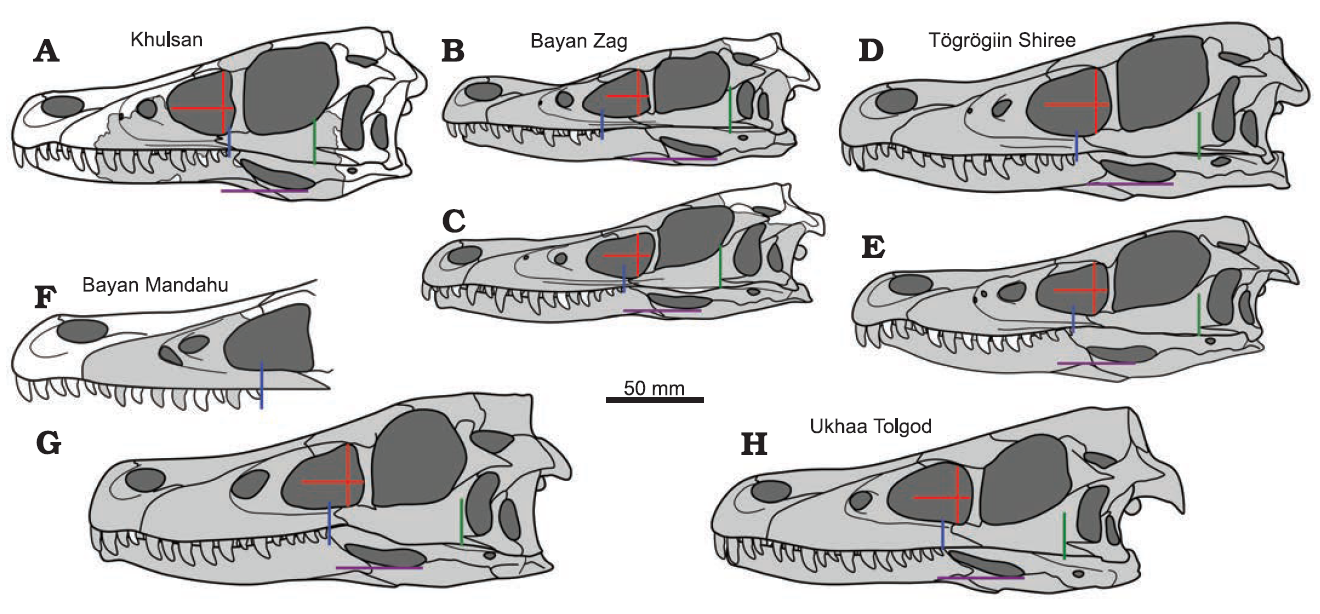
The skulls of several velociraptorines which are believed to be close relatives of Kansaignathus

The only portion of the skull which was preserved is the right dentary, which is almost complete. It preserves 12 alveoli, which is fewer than most other velociraptorines (which usually have 14-16 dentary teeth). The dentary itself has several distinct features including a rectangular shape when viewed from the side, a down-turned process on the anterior side of the bone, and a small prominence in the symphysis area at the front of the bone where it would have met with the left dentary. The two dentaries were probably joined at a relatively acute angle, which is common in dromaeosaurs. However, the holotype is relatively unique in preserving several rows of nutrient foramina, which imparts a rugose texture to the lateral surface of the bone in some areas.

None of the teeth are preserved, but the shape of the alveoli indicates that the teeth would have likely been mediolaterally flattened and increase in size towards the anterior end of the jaw until the ninth tooth position, when they decrease in size again. Two partially-grown teeth are preserved in the sixth and twelfth tooth positions, but they were in the early stages of growth when the animal was fossilized, so they do not convey much information about the in-life nature of the animal's teeth.

=== Postcranial skeleton ===
Additional material from Kansaignathus was known about at the time of its initial description, but it was initially believed to belong to a new taxon. It wasn't until 2023 when the material was reviewed in detail that most of these bones were referred to the genus. This referral was based on their occurrence at the same locality as the holotype and a lack of evidence for multiple dromaeosaurid taxa in the similarly-aged Bissekty and Bayan Shireh formations.

The sacrum is mostly preserved (only missing part of the third vertebra), and it bears similarities to other dromaeosaurs. These include the fusion of the sacral neural spines into a single ridge and a similar fusion of the sacral zygapophyses. Kansaignathus also resembles the taxa Natovenator and Sinornithosaurus for lacking pleurocoels on the sacral vertebrae.

The holotype also preserves two of the phalanges of the animal, which the authors suggest are likely from the hand. They hypothesize that the lack of well-developed flexor tubercules on the articular surface between the phalanx and ungual indicates relatively little flexibility in the joints, which are known to occur in the feet of dromaeosaurs (e.g. for their killing claws). Kansaignathus resembles the related genus Kuru in this respect, although the tubercles are larger in the former than in the latter. Two of the claws are preserved, and they are relatively thick in comparison with other dromaeosaurs. A third claw was also preserved, but was much smaller in size and is suggested to be from a juvenile individual.

Lastly, a metatarsal is described. It is believed to be the third metatarsal because of how it bends along its length. It is typical in morphology among dromaeosaurs and does not exhibit the arctometatarsalian condition (seen in other coelurosaurs). The metatarsal flexes distally, which is similar to the condition in Velociraptor, Dromaeosaurus, and the poorly-understood genus Hulsanpes.

== Classification ==
In their description of Kansaignathus, Averianov and Lupatin conducted a phylogenetic analysis using 38 dromaeosaurid taxa coded for 180 morphological characters, which was originally compiled by Jasinski et al. in their 2020 description of Dineobellator. Their results were mostly inconclusive, and in the discussion of their analysis, the authors state that most inter-relationships of dromaeosaurids are uncertain. However, the resolution of their analysis is considerably higher in their grouping of Kansaignathus as a basal member of velociraptorinae (83% of the 2700 most parsimonious trees). An abbreviated result of their analysis is shown below.

- Eudromaeosauria
  - Bambiraptor
  - - Dakotaraptor
    - - Saurornitholestinae
        - Atrociraptor
        - Saurornitholestes
      - - Dromaeosaurinae
          - Bayan Shireh dromaeosaurid
          - - Boreonykus
            - - Achillobator
              - Dromaeosaurus
              - Utahraptor
        - Velociraptorinae
          - Deinonychus
          - - Kansaignathus
            - - Acheroraptor
              - - Adasaurus
                - Velociraptor mongoliensis
                - - "Velociraptor" osmolskae
                  - - Dineobellator
                    - - Linheraptor
                      - Tsaagan

Averianov and Lupatin suggest the implications that the discovery of Kansaignathus has for the biogeography of dromaeosaurs during the middle and late Cretaceous. They hypothesize that velociraptorines originated in North America before migrating to Asia and diversifying there during the Cretaceous and dispersing back into Laramidia. They are also uncertain as to the relationship between Kansaignathus and its contemporary genera in Kazakhstan and Uzbekistan, such as Itemirus and several teeth known from the Bostobe Formation, due to the incomplete nature of these remains.

With the description of the additional material in 2023, Averianov and Lupatin conducted their phylogenetic analysis a second time with the new character data of the referred material included. This did not fundamentally alter the placement of Kansaignathus in their final tree, and they stated that the higher-level interrelationships between dromaeosaurs is still uncertain.

== Paleoecology ==
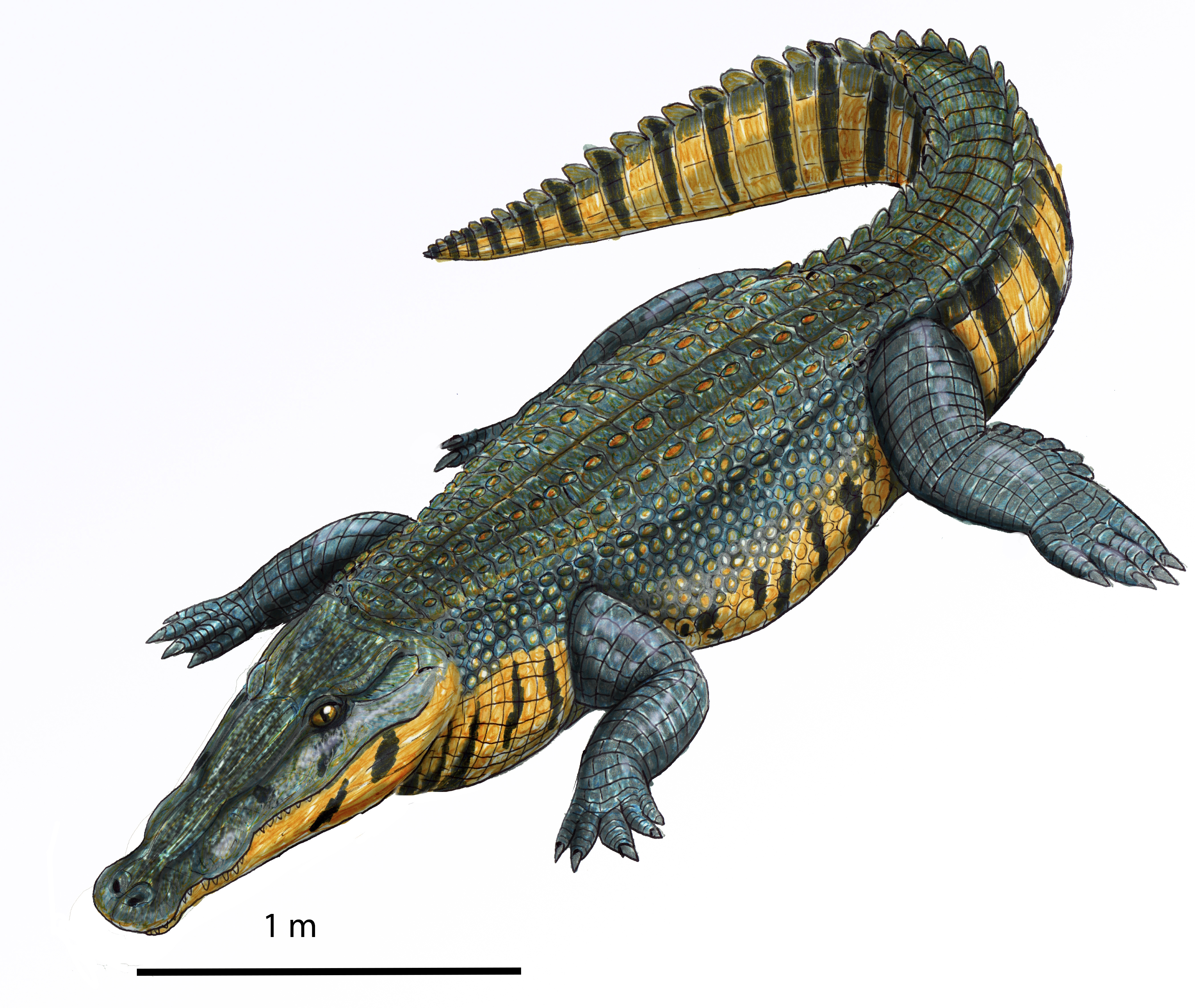
Kansajsuchus, the best-known animal from the Yalovach Formation

The fauna of the Yalovach Formation most resemble the roughly contemporaneous Bostobe and Bissekty formations. The abundant chondrichthyan genera Hybodus and Myledaphus, which are known from freshwater deposits all over the world both have species represented in the Yalovach Formation. They are accompanied by amphibians like Eoscapherpeton and turtles like Shachemys, Khunnuchelys, and Lindholmemys, which are also common in Late Cretaceous freshwater deposits.

However, the Yalovach Formation is considerably less fossiliferous than the Bissekty Formation, and Kansaignathus is the only named dinosaur from this locality. Other dinosaur taxa are known to have lived in the area, but due to the fragmentary nature of these remains, these have all remained unnamed. These fragmentary remains include teeth from sauropods, basal tyrannosauroids and troodontids, claws and part of a femur from a primitive therizinosaur, and an isolated metacarpal from an ornithomimosaur. More complete remains have been described from hadrosauroids and oviraptorosaurs, but these taxa also remain unnamed.

The most well-studied animals from this formation are the crocodyliformes, of which there are two. The first, Kansajsuchus, is known from a disarticulated and partially complete skull. The second, Tadzhikosuchus, is known from less material and is possibly dubious and undiagnostic.

Very little has been inferred about the relationships between different animals in these ecosystems because of the fragmentary and sparse nature of the remains, but some authors have commented on potential ongoing or future study in the area.

== See also ==
- 2021 in archosaur paleontology
- 2023 in archosaur paleontology
- List of Asian dinosaurs
- Paleontological Institute, Russian Academy of Sciences (formerly the Academy of Sciences of the USSR)
- Timeline of dromaeosaurid research
