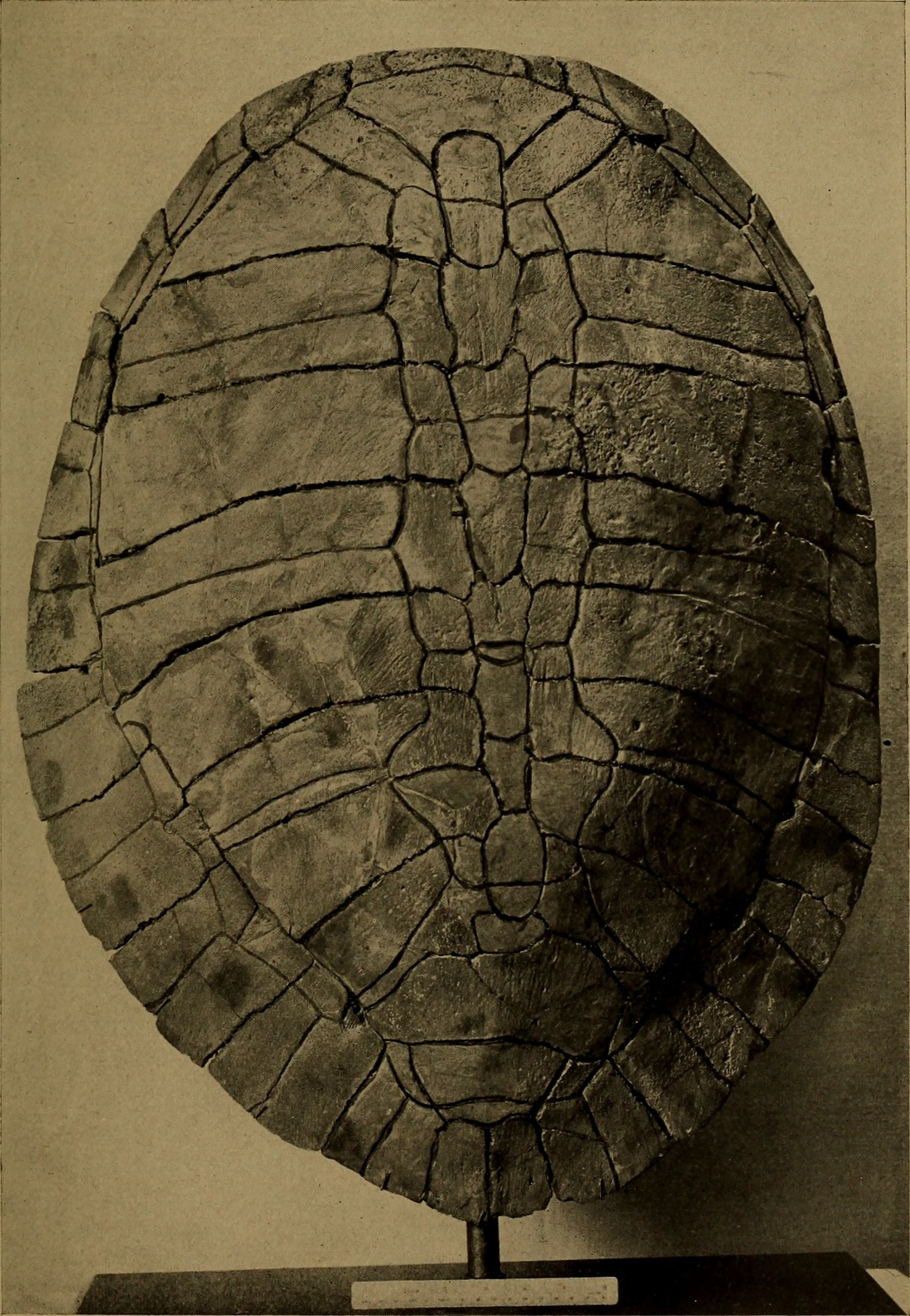
- Osteopygis emarginatus carapace

Scientific classification
- Kingdom: Animalia
- Phylum: Chordata
- Class: Reptilia
- Clade: Pantestudines
- Clade: Testudinata
- Clade: Perichelydia
- Family: †Macrobaenidae; Sukhanov, 1964

Genera
- See text

= Macrobaenidae =

Macrobaenidae Temporal range: Early Cretaceous–Paleocene

Extinct family of turtles

Macrobaenidae is an extinct family of turtles, known from the Early Cretaceous to Paleogene of Laurasia. Their relationships to other turtles and whether they form a monophlyletic group are controversial. They are typically interpreted as stem or crown group cryptodires, but some more recent analyses have found them to lie outside crown group Testudines. Macrobaenids can be distinguished from other testudinatans by the presence of a carotid fenestra, cruciform plastron with strap-like epiplastra, and a lack of extragulars.

== Genera ==
- Anatolemys Central Asia, Late Cretaceous ( Khodzhakul Formation, Uzbekistan, Cenomanian, Bissekty Formation, Uzbekistan, Turonian, Bostobe Formation, Kazakhstan, Santonian Yalovach Formation, Tajikistan, Santonian)
- Appalachemys Mooreville Chalk, Alabama, Late Cretaceous (Santonian–Campanian)
- Asiachelys Khulsangol Formation, Mongolia, Early Cretaceous (Albian)
- Aurorachelys Kanguk Formation, Canada, Turonian
- Changmachelys Xiagou Formation, China, Early Cretaceous (Aptian)
- Kirgizemys Murtoi Formation, Khilok Formation, Ilek Formation, Russia, Early Cretaceous (Barremian-Aptian), Alamyshik Formation, Kyrgyzstan, Albian, Geoncheonri Formation, South Korea, Albian Khodzhakul Formation, Uzbekistan, Cenomanian
- Judithemys North America, Late Cretaceous–Paleocene
- Gallica Paris Basin, France, Paleocene
- Macrobaena Naran Bulak Formation, Mongolia, Paleocene
- Osteopygis Late Cretaceous-Paleocene, North America
- Oxemys Khodzhakul Formation, Uzbekistan, Cenomanian
- Yakemys Phu Kradung Formation, Thailand, Early Cretaceous (Berriasian)

Hongkongochelys from the Middle-Late Jurassic of China has sometimes been attributed to the family, but other times has been attriuted to Sinemydidae, a group which has an unresolved relationship with Macrobaenidae.
