= Anatolemys =

Anatolemys Temporal range: Cenomanian-Santonian ~99.6–83.5 Ma

Scientific classification
- Domain: Eukaryota
- Kingdom: Animalia
- Phylum: Chordata
- Class: Reptilia
- Clade: Pantestudines
- Clade: Testudinata
- Family: †Macrobaenidae
- Genus: †Anatolemys; Khozatsky & Nessov 1979

Type species
- †Anatolemys maximus Khozatsky & Nessov 1979

Species
- A. oxensis Khozatsky & Nessov 1979; A. maximus Khozatsky & Nessov 1979

Extinct genus of turtles

Anatolemys is an extinct turtle genus in the family Macrobaenidae. Two species are known, both of which lived in the Late Cretaceous. Fossils were discovered in the Yalovach Formation of Tajikistan, the Kulbikin Member and Khodzhakul and Bissekty Formations of Uzbekistan and the Bostobe Formation of Kazakhstan. With 70 cm (2.3 ft) in carapace length, Anatolemys maximus was one of the three largest macrobaenids along with Early Cretaceous Yakemys multiporcata and Paleocene Judithemys backmani.
