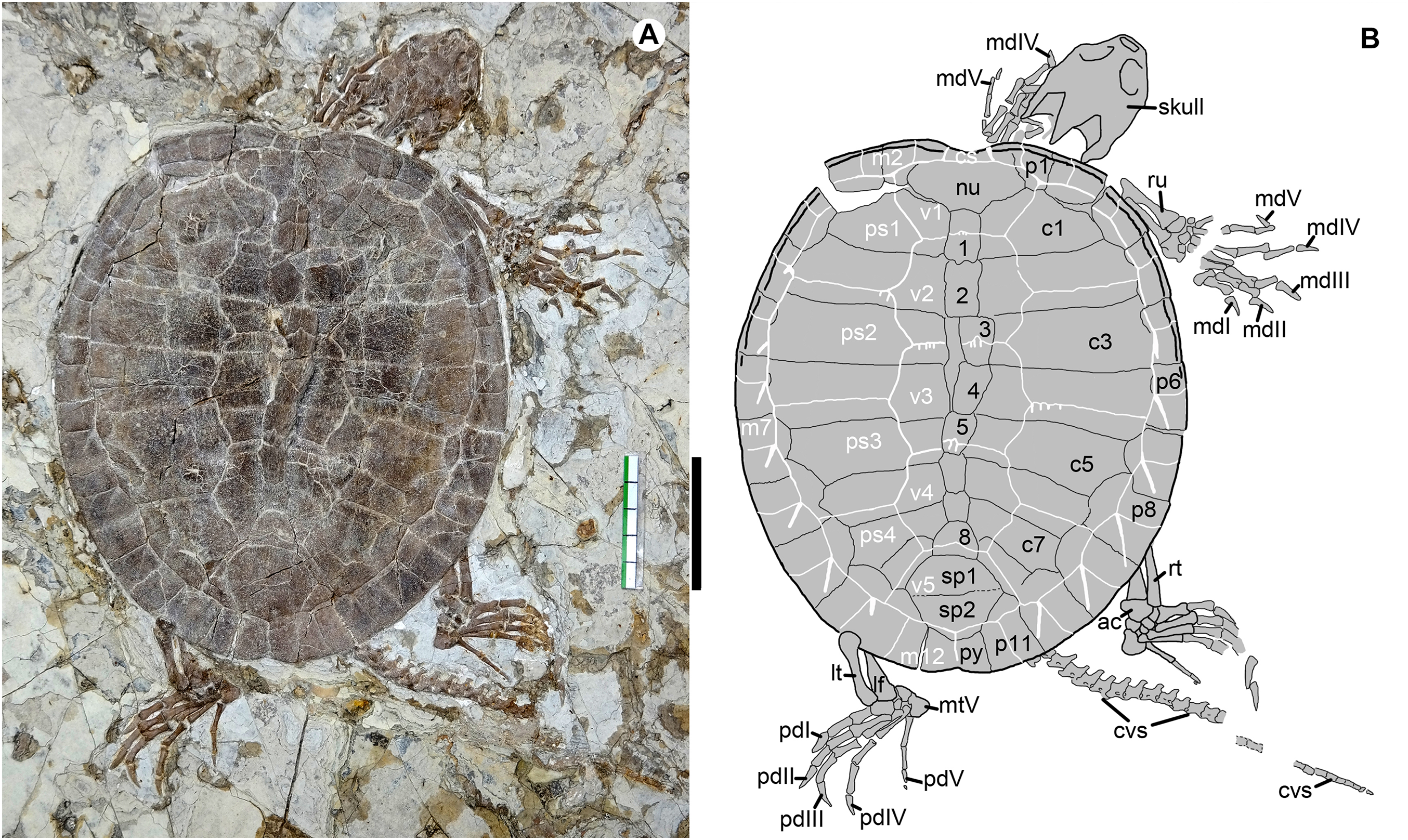
- Holotype specimen shown from above
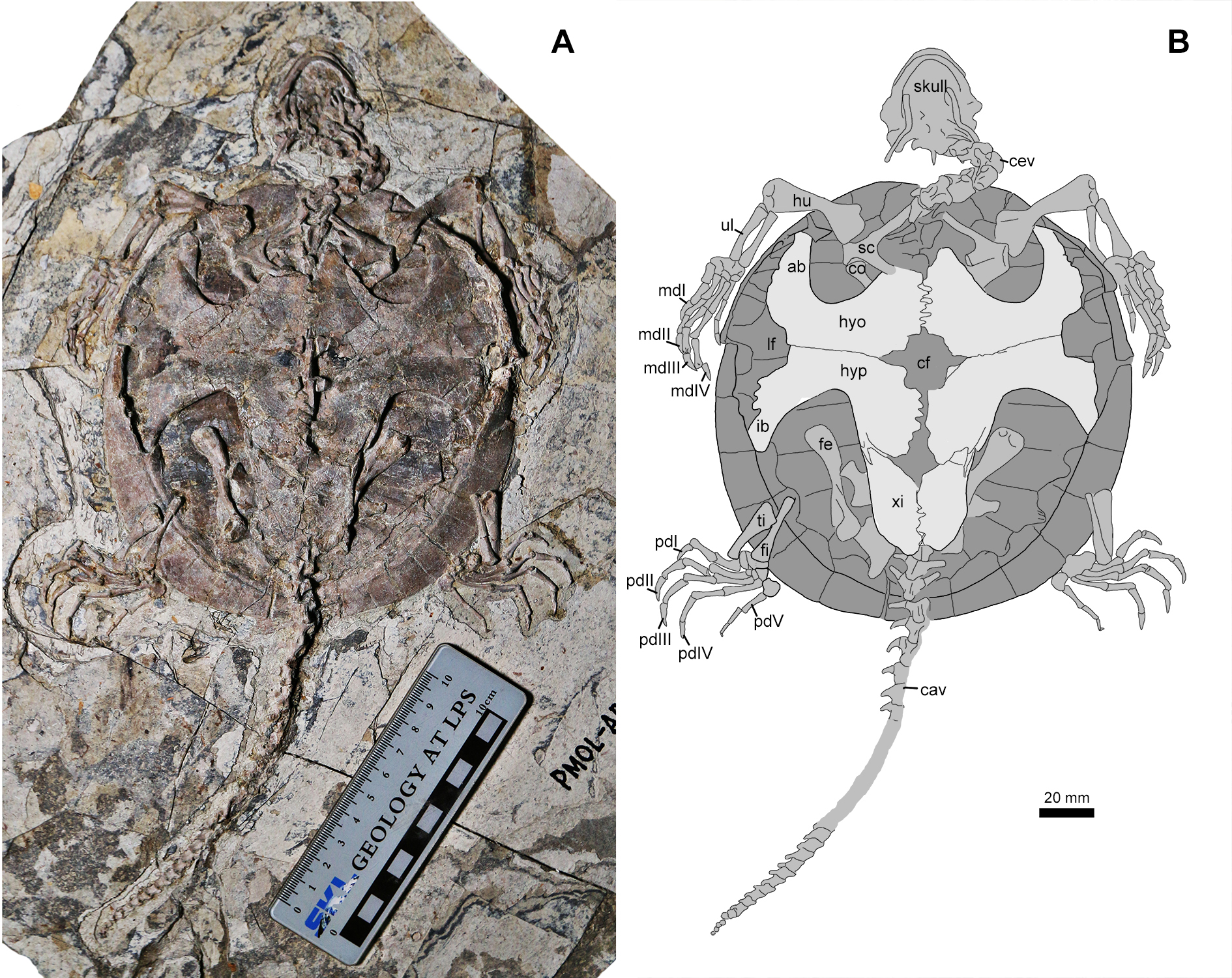
- Assigned specimen shown from below

Scientific classification
- Kingdom: Animalia
- Phylum: Chordata
- Class: Reptilia
- Clade: Pantestudines
- Clade: Testudinata
- Family: †Sinemydidae
- Genus: †Jeholochelys; Shao et al., 2018

Species
- J. lingyuanensis Shao et al., 2018

= Jeholochelys =

Jeholochelys Temporal range: Early Cretaceous

Extinct genus of turtles

Jeholochelys is an extinct genus of sinemydid turtle that lived during the Early Cretaceous of what is now China. The holotype specimen was discovered in the Jiufotang Formation of Sihedang in Lingyuan, western Liaoning. In 2018, the Chinese palaeontologist Shuai Shao and colleagues named the new genus and species Jeholochelys lingyuanensis based on the specimen. The generic name consists of "Jehol", which refers to the Jehol biota, and "chelys", Greek for turtle. The specific name refers to the type locality. Seven skeletons were described in the study, five nearly complete, two consisting of shells (four appear to be juveniles), and hundreds of turtle fossils have been found in the area. The described specimens are kept in the Paleontological Museum of Liaoning.

Jeholochelys lived in freshwater and was characterised by hyperphalangy, the increase in the number of phalanx bones in the digits (it had one additional phalanx bone in the fifth toe compared to what is common among living turtles). This condition is often linked to tetrapod animals with an aquatic lifestyle, where it contributes to forming long flippers in, for example, modern whales, and in the extinct ichthyosaurs and plesiosaurs. Modern soft-shelled turtles also exhibit hyperphalangy, but though this does not result in long flippers, it may help enlarge the paddle surface and aid aquatic movement. Other aquatic and marine turtles instead have elongated limbs and phalanges, and land turtles have short limbs and feet.

Jeholochelys was found to be related to coexisting sinemydid turtles, most closely to Xiaochelys and Changmachelys, and like other Cretaceous relatives, it had a low-domed shell. Jeholochelys fossils are evidence that hyperphalangy evolved multiple times among turtles; other coexisting sinemydids did not have an additional phalanx bone. The proportions of the forelimb in Jeholochelys were similar to those in soft-shelled turtles, and it may have been adapted for aquatic habits to a similar degree.
