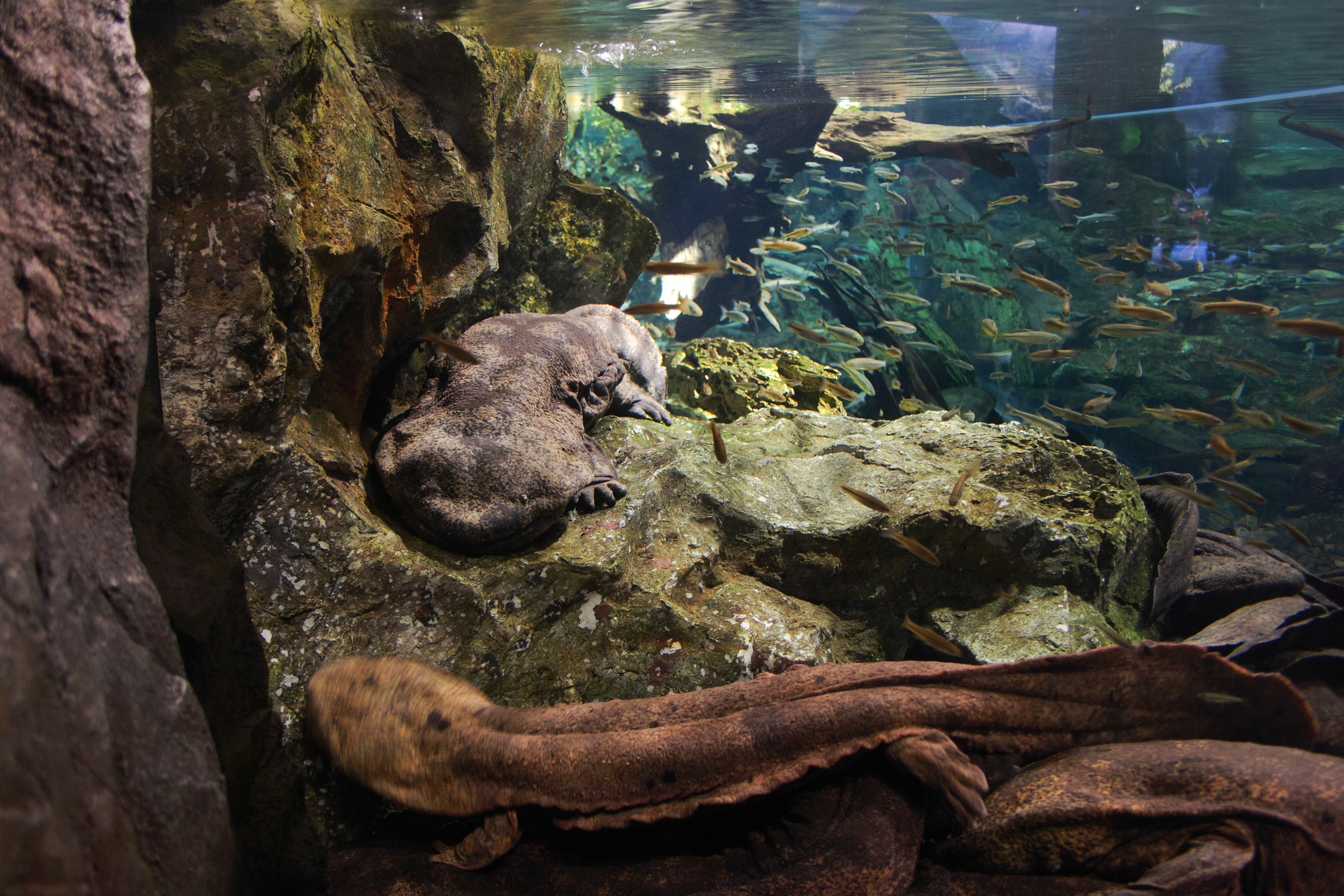
- Andrias japonicus

Scientific classification
- Kingdom: Animalia
- Phylum: Chordata
- Class: Amphibia
- Order: Urodela
- Suborder: Cryptobranchoidea
- Family: Cryptobranchidae; Fitzinger, 1826

Genera
- †Aviturus; Andrias; Cryptobranchus; †Eoscapherpeton; †Limnospondylus; †Ulanurus; †Zaissanurus; †Limnospondylus

= Giant salamander =

Giant salamanders Temporal range: Cenomanian–Recent

Family of amphibians

The Cryptobranchidae (commonly known as giant salamanders) are a family of large salamanders that are fully aquatic. The family includes some of the largest living amphibians. They are native to China, Japan, and the eastern United States. Giant salamanders constitute one of two living families—the other being the Asiatic salamanders belonging to the family Hynobiidae—within the Cryptobranchoidea, one of two main divisions of living salamanders.

The largest species are in the genus Andrias, native to east Asia. The South China giant salamander (Andrias sligoi) can reach a length of 1.8 m (5.9 ft). The Japanese giant salamander (Andrias japonicus) reaches up to 1.44 m (4.7 ft) in length, feeds at night on fish and crustaceans, and has been known to live for more than 50 years in captivity.

The hellbender (Cryptobranchus alleganiensis) inhabits the eastern United States and is the only member of the genus Cryptobranchus.

== Taxonomy ==
The family name is from the Ancient Greek krypto ("hidden"), and branch ("gill"), which refer to how the members absorb oxygen through capillaries of their side-frills, which function as gills.

Clade Pancryptobrancha (Cryptobranchidae + Ukrainurus)

- Genus †Ukrainurus Ukraine, Miocene
  - †Ukrainurus hypsognathus
- Genus †Chunerpeton? China, Middle Jurassic
  - †Chunerpeton tianyiensis
- Family Cryptobranchidae
  - Genus Cryptobranchus (hellbenders)
    - †Cryptobranchus saskatchewanensis? Ravenscrag Formation, Canada, Paleocene
    - Cryptobranchus alleganiensis (hellbender)
  - Genus Andrias (Asian giant salamanders; sometimes classified among the Cryptobranchus)
    - Andrias cheni (Qimen giant salamander)
    - Andrias davidianus (Chinese giant salamander) – (Simplified Chinese: 娃娃鱼; pinyin: wáwáyú) (may actually be a species complex of 5 different species)
    - Andrias sligoi (South China giant salamander)
    - Andrias japonicus (Japanese giant salamander) – (Japanese: オオサンショウウオ)
    - Andrias jiangxiensis (Jiangxi giant salamander)
    - †Andrias matthewi North America, Miocene
    - †Andrias scheuchzeri Europe, Oligocene-Pliocene
  - Genus †Eoscapherpeton Central Asia, Late Cretaceous (Cenomanian-Campanian)
  - Genus †Aviturus Mongolia, Paleocene
    - †Aviturus exsecratus
  - Genus † Limnospondylus Japan, Pliocene
    - † Limnospondylus ajimuensis
  - Genus †Ulanurus Mongolia, Paleocene
    - †Ulanurus fractus
  - Genus †Zaissanurus Kazakhstan, Oligocene
    - †Zaissanurus beliajevae

=== Phylogeny ===
The following phylogeny is based on Vasilyan et al. (2013):

- - Pancryptobranchia
    - †Ukrainurus
    - Cryptobranchidae
      - Cryptobranchus
      - - †Aviturus
        - †Zaissanurus
        - Andrias

The well-represented Cretaceous Eoscapherpeton was not phylogenetically placed. The enigmatic "Cryptobranchus" saskatchewanensis of Paleocene Canada may actually represent a stem-cryptobranchid.

== Description ==
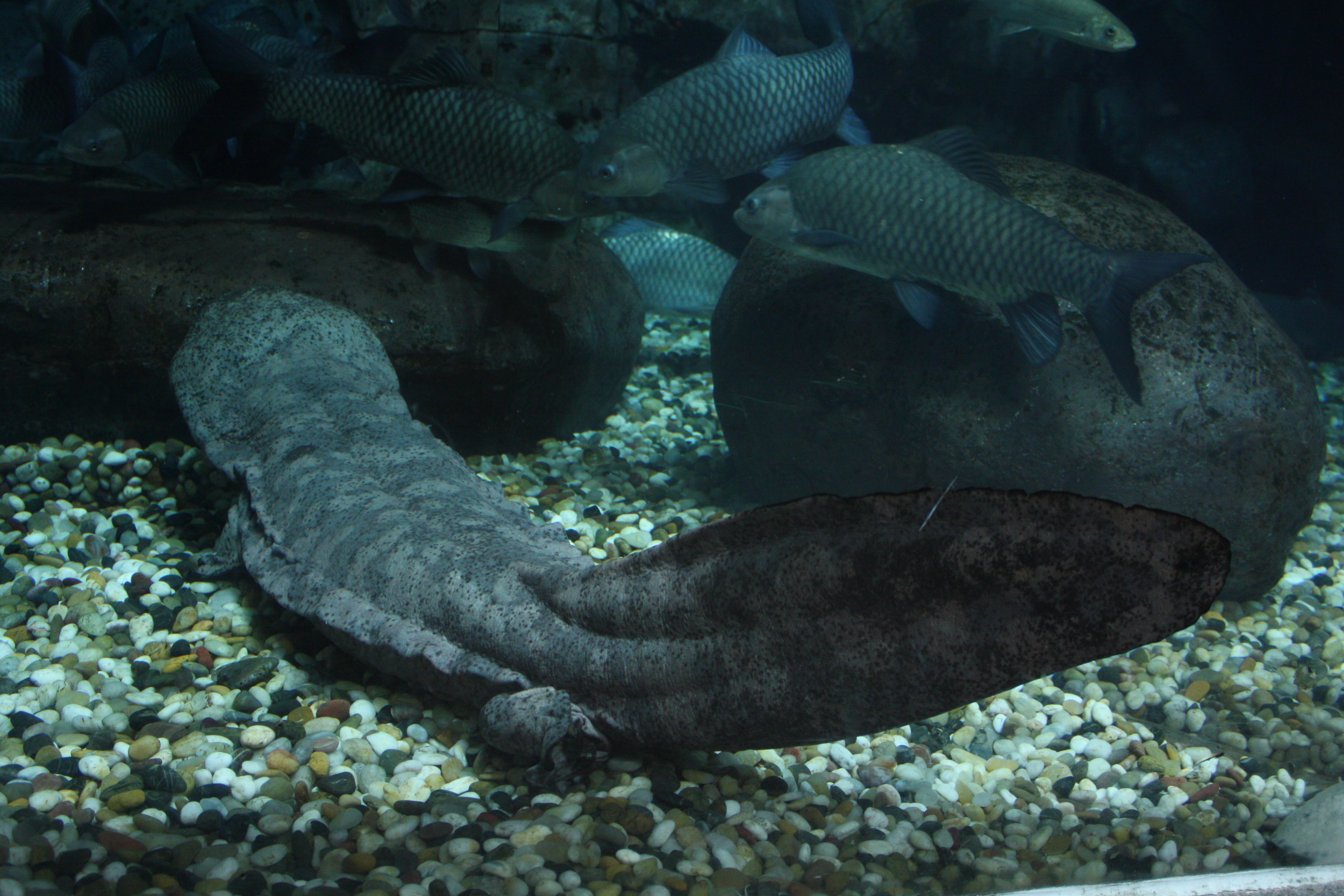
A Chinese giant salamander in the Shanghai Aquarium.

Cryptobranchids are large and predominantly nocturnal salamanders that can reach a length of 1.8 m (5.9 ft), though most are considerably smaller today. Despite being aquatic, they are poor swimmers and mostly just walk on the bottom. Swimming by undulatory locomotion is generally used just for short distance-escapes to hiding places. The body is stout with large folds of skin along the flanks and a heavy, laterally compressed tail. These folds help increase the animals' surface area, allowing them to absorb more oxygen from the water as the adults lacks gills and have poorly developed lungs. Like in the majority of salamander species, there are four toes on the fore limbs and five on the hind limbs. They have paedomorphic traits, meaning their metamorphosis from the larval stage is incomplete, so they lack eyelids and the adults retain gill slits (open in the hellbender, closed in Andrias). Eyes are small and the eyesight bad.

== Distribution and habitat ==
In Japan, their natural habitats are threatened by dam-building. Ramps and staircases have been added to some dams to allow them to move upstream to areas where they spawn.

== Behavior ==
A Japanese giant salamander lived for 52 years in captivity.

=== Feeding ===
Giant salamanders eats aquatic insects, fish, frogs and crustaceans. They hunt mainly at night. As they have poor eyesight, they use sensory nodes on their heads and bodies to detect minute changes in water pressure, enabling them to find their prey. Prey is captured by suction feeding, and they can also employ this feeding mechanism while opening their mouths asymmetrically, facilitated by a flexible jaw joint and loosely connected halves of the lower jaw.

=== Reproduction ===
During mating season, the salamanders travel upstream, where the female lays two strings of over 200 eggs each. Lacking the stereotypical courtship behaviors found in other species, the male fertilizes the eggs externally by releasing his sperm onto them, and then guards them for at least three months, until they hatch. Tail fanning also occurs in order to increase the oxygen supply for the eggs. At this point, the larvae live off their noticeable stored fat until ready to hunt. Once ready, they hunt as a group rather than individually.

Scientists at Hiroshima City Asa Zoological Park in Japan have recently discovered the male salamander will spawn with more than one female in his den. Only large males can occupy and guard a den. They guard the den against other males and sexually inactive females. Those that are sexually active are welcomed. On occasion, the male "den master" will also allow a second male (smaller male salamanders, named "satellite males", who do not have their own den) into the den; the reason for this is unclear.

== Fossil record ==
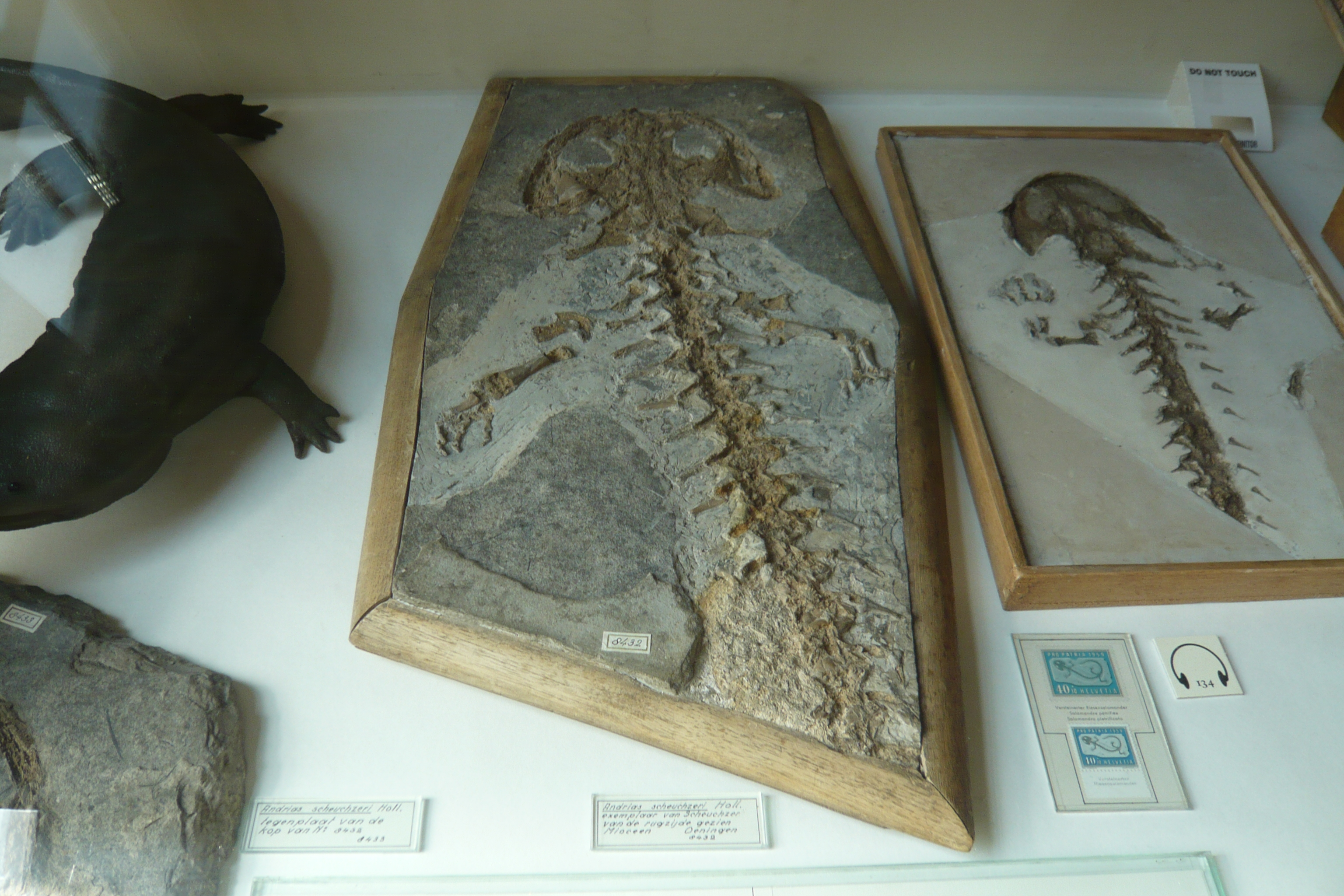
Andrias scheuchzeri

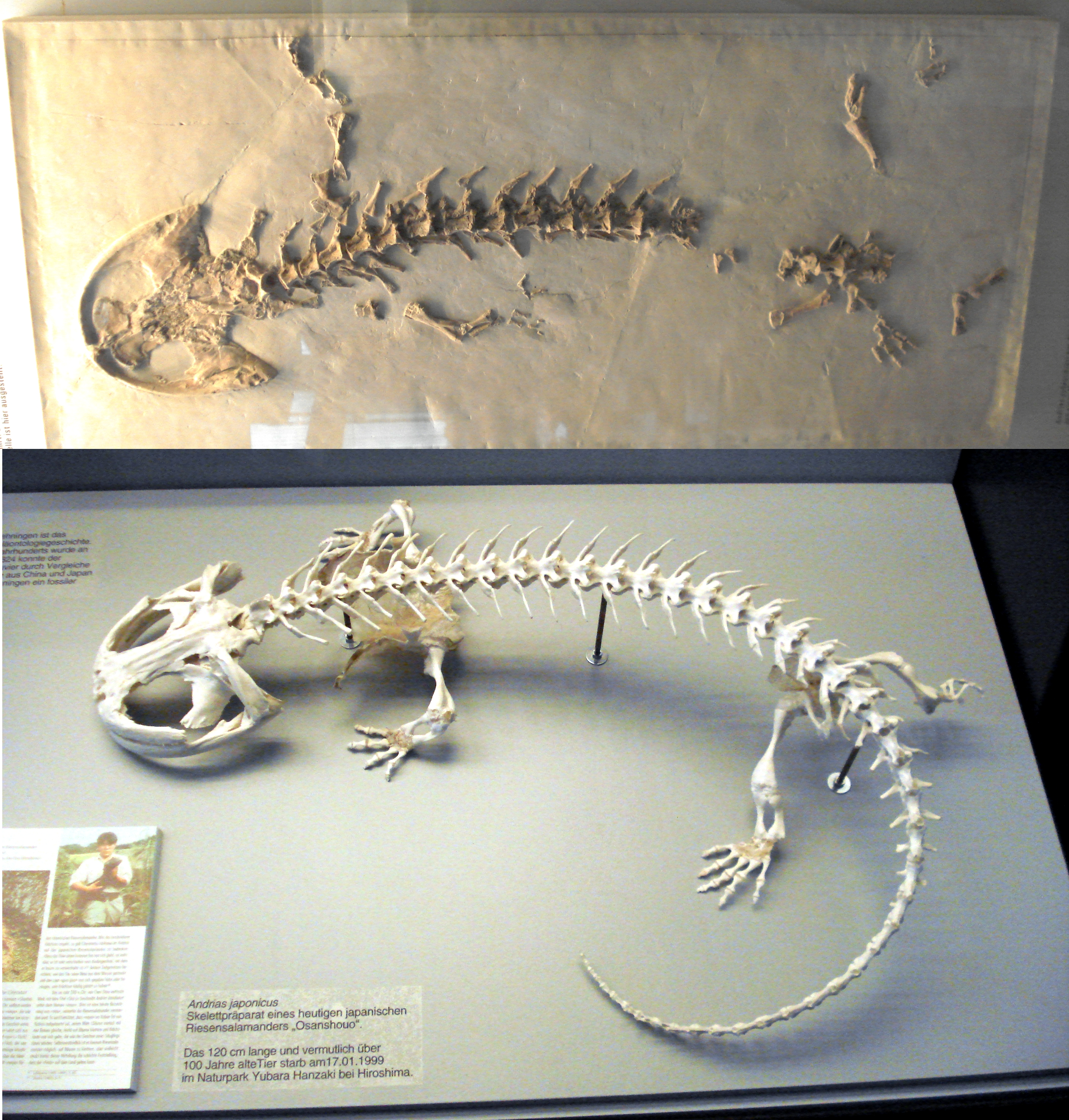
Fossil and recent Andrias skeletons, Paläontologische Institut und Museum, Universitat Zurich.

Extant species in the family Cryptobranchidae are the modern-day members of a lineage that extends back tens of millions of years. The oldest known fossils of cryptobranchoids are known from the Middle Jurassic of China. Chunerpeton from the Middle Jurassic of China has been suggested to represent the oldest known cryptobranchid. However, some studies have found it to be a more basal cryptobranchoid not more closely related to Cryptobranchidae than to Hynobiidae. The next oldest cryptobranchid is Eoscapherpeton, known from numerous Late Cretaceous deposits in Central Asia, which is suggested to represent a stem-group to modern cryptobranchids. Modern crown group representatives appear during the Paleocene.

As the fossil record for the Cryptobranchidae shows an Asian origin for the family, how these salamanders made it to the eastern US has been a point of scientific interest. Research has indicated a dispersal via land bridge, with waves of adaptive radiation seeming to have swept the Americas from north to south.

In 1726, the Swiss physician Johann Jakob Scheuchzer described a fossil as Homo diluvii testis (Latin: Evidence of a diluvian human), believing it to be the remains of a human being who drowned in the biblical flood. The Teylers Museum in Haarlem, Netherlands, bought the fossil in 1802, where it is still exhibited. In 1812, the fossil was examined by Georges Cuvier, who recognized that it was not human. After being identified as a salamander, it was renamed Salamandra scheuchzeri by Holl in 1831. The genus Andrias was coined six years later by Tschudi. In doing so, both the genus, Andrias (which means "image of man"), and the specific name, scheuchzeri, ended up honouring Scheuchzer and his beliefs. It and the extant A. davidianus cannot be mutually distinguished, and the latter, only described in 1871, is therefore sometimes considered a synonym of the former.
