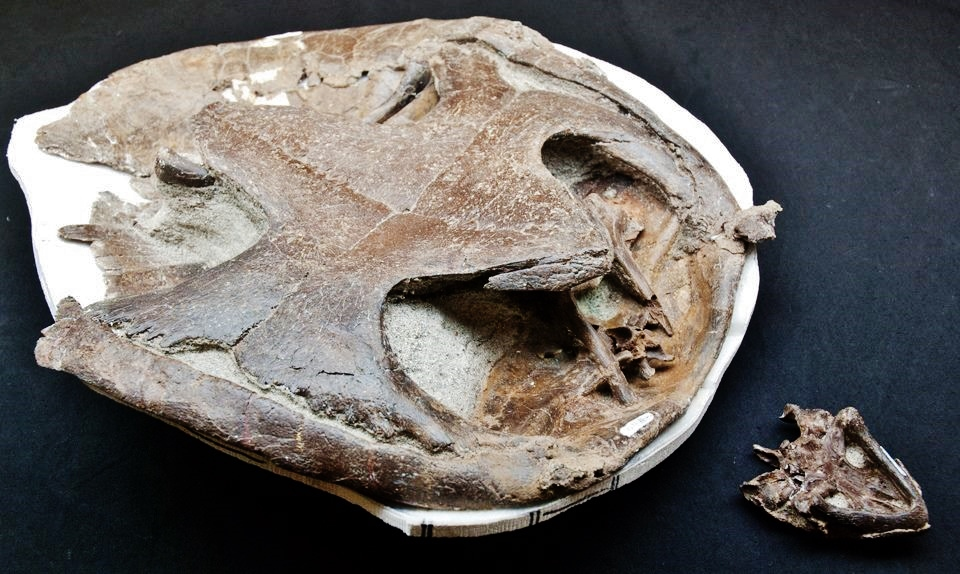
- Judithemys sukhanovi

Scientific classification
- Kingdom: Animalia
- Phylum: Chordata
- Class: Reptilia
- Clade: Pantestudines
- Clade: Testudinata
- Family: †Macrobaenidae
- Genus: †Judithemys; Parham & Hutchison, 2003

Type species
- †Judithemys sukhanovi Parham & Hutchison, 2003

= Judithemys =

Judithemys Temporal range: Late Cretaceous, 77.0–75.5 Ma

Genus of fossil turtle

Judithemys is an extinct genus of macrobaenid turtle from the Late Cretaceous of Alberta.

== Naming and description ==
It is known from a single species, J. sukhanovi, named in 2003 by James F. Parham and John H. Hutchison from multiple specimens including a skull found in the Dinosaur Park Formation, though historically it has also included three species that were moved into Osteopygis following the phylogenetic results of Andrew D. Gentry, Caitlín R. Kiernan, and Parham in 2023. Judithemys can be distinguished from Osteopygis by the absence of a hole in the center of the plastron, and from Aurorachelys and Appalachemys by having a carapace that is not noticeably longer than wide.
