= Zhirkindek Formation =

Geologic formation in Kazakhstan

- Stratigraphic range: Turonian-Coniacian; ~92–88 Ma
- Type: Geological formation
- Underlies: Bostobe Formation
- Thickness: At least 42 m (138 ft)

Lithology
- Primary: Sandstone
- Other: Claystone, siltstone

Location
- Coordinates: 46.2°N 64.2°E
- Approximate paleocoordinates: 41.0°N 57.3°E
- Region: Qyzylorda
- Country: Kazakhstan
- Zhirkindek Formation (Kazakhstan)

The Zhirkindek Formation is a Late Cretaceous geologic formation in Kazakhstan. The primary lithology is sand with interbeds of clay and silt, and represents a coastal to coastal marine environment. The formation has produced numerous fossils, including Lindholmemydid and Trionychid cryptodires, indeterminate remains of dinosaurs (Ankylosauridae indet., Hadrosauroidea indet., Neoceratopsia indet., Sauropoda indet., Tyrannosauroidea indet., Ornithomimidae indet., Therizinosauroidea indet and Dromaeosauridae indet) and an indeterminate species of pterosaur Azhdarcho.

== See also ==
- List of dinosaur-bearing rock formations
- List of fossiliferous stratigraphic units in Kazakhstan
