= Zhyrasuchus =

Zhyrasuchus Temporal range: Late Cretaceous

Scientific classification
- Kingdom: Animalia
- Phylum: Chordata
- Class: Reptilia
- Clade: Archosauria
- Order: Crocodilia
- Superfamily: Crocodyloidea
- Family: Crocodylidae
- Genus: †Zhyrasuchus; Nessov et al., 1989

Type species
- Z. angustifrons Nessov et al., 1989

Extinct genus of reptiles

Zhyrasuchus is an extinct monospecific genus of crocodylomorph that may have been a crocodylid eusuchian, but is only known from scanty material including a frontal (one of the bones of the roof of the skull). Its fossils were found in the Coniacian-age Upper Cretaceous Bissekty Formation of Dzharakhuduk, Uzbekistan. Zhyrasuchus was described in 1989 by Lev Nessov and colleagues. The type species is Z. angustifrons. A 2000 review by Glenn Storrs and Mikhail Efimov could not determine how Zhyrasuchus and the contemporaneous Tadzhikosuchus were related, or even if they were synonyms, due to the poor fossils available.
