= Zhalmouzia =

Zhalmouzia Temporal range: Santonian

Scientific classification
- Kingdom: Animalia
- Phylum: Chordata
- Class: Mammalia
- Family: †Zhelestidae
- Genus: †Zhalmouzia
- Species: †Z. bazhanovi

Binomial name
- †Zhalmouzia bazhanovi Averianov et al., 2014

Extinct genus of mammals

Zhalmouzia is an extinct genus of zhelestid that lived during the Santonian stage of the Late Cretaceous epoch.

== Distribution ==
Zhalmouzia bazhanovi is known from the Bostobe Formation of Kazakhstan.
