= List of fossiliferous stratigraphic units in Kazakhstan =

Group or Formation	Period	Notes
Adaev Formation	Paleogene	
Agalatas Formation	Ordovician	
Aigyrzhal'skaya Suite Formation	Devonian	
Akkerme Formation	Silurian	
Akkolka Formation	Permian	
Aktas Formation	Cambrian	
Akzhal Formation	Ordovician	
Akzhar Formation	Paleogene	
Alakol' Suite Formation	Jurassic	
Anderken Formation	Ordovician	
Angrensor Formation	Ordovician	
Aral Formation	Neogene, Paleogene	
Argun Group/Bystrinskaya Formation	Cambrian	
Ashchikol' Suite Formation	Jurassic, Triassic	
Baigendzhi Formation	Permian	
Baigendzhin Formation	Permian	
Bayanaulian Formation	Cambrian	
Besobinsk Formation	Devonian	
Bestamakian Suite Formation	Ordovician	
Bestogai Formation	Cambrian	
Boroldai Suite Formation	Jurassic	
Bosagin Formation	Cretaceous	
Bostobe Formation	Cretaceous	
Buralkenyntuz Formation	Cretaceous	
Chakpaktassk Formation	Paleogene	
Chanak Formation	Cretaceous	
Chegan Formation	Paleogene	
Chilikta Formation	Paleogene	
Chilikty Formation	Paleogene	
Chingiz Formation	Cambrian	
Chokpar Formation	Ordovician	
Chul'adyr Formation	Neogene	
Chulaktau Formation	Cambrian	
Coal Suite Formation	Jurassic	
Dabrazhin Formation	Cretaceous	
Darbasa Formation	Cretaceous	
Darbaza Formation	Cambrian	
Darbazin Formation	Cretaceous	
Dubovka Suite Formation	Jurassic	
Dubovskaya Formation	Jurassic	
Dulankara Formation	Ordovician	
Duzbay Suite Formation	Jurassic	
Dzharkent Suite Formation	Jurassic	
Eginsai Formation	Cretaceous	
Ilek Suite Formation	Jurassic	
Ili Formation	Neogene	
Inder Formation	Triassic	
Kairlagan Suite Formation	Jurassic	
Karabastau Formation	Jurassic	
Karadzhatykskaya Formation	Triassic	
Karagan Suite Formation	Jurassic	
Karaginskaya Formation	Paleogene	
Karakol Formation	Carboniferous	
Katu Suite Formation	Jurassic	
Khantausskaya Formation	Permian	
Kokbajtal Formation	Devonian	
Koldzat Formation	Triassic	
Kolpak Formation	Paleogene	
Koturbulak Formation	Cretaceous	
Kugaly Formation	Permian	
Kurgan Formation	Ediacaran	
Kyr-Shabakty Formation	Cambrian	
Kyzyltal Suite	Jurassic	
Malokaroyskaya Group/Chichkanskaya Formation	Ediacaran	
Manrak Formation	Cretaceous	
Mayantas Formation	Ordovician	
Maychat Formation	Permian	
Maykuduk Suite Formation	Jurassic	
Mikhailovka Suite Formation	Jurassic	
Pavlodar Formation	Neogene	
Pribalkhash Formation	Devonian	
Rytovo Formation	Neogene	
Sarykumy Formation	Cambrian	
Sasykol Formation	Cretaceous	
Shabakta Formation	Cambrian	
Shabakty Formation	Cambrian, Ordovician	
Shet-Irgiz Formation	Cretaceous	
Shoptykol' Suite Formation	Jurassic	
Shorym Formation	Paleogene	
Sokur Suite Formation	Jurassic	
Syuksyuk Formation	Cretaceous	
Taldyboi Formation	Ordovician	
Taldykol' Suite Formation	Jurassic	
Tartalinskaya Formation	Triassic	
Tavda Formation	Paleogene	
Temirchin Formation	Cretaceous	
Tokrau Formation	Silurian	
Tologoi Formation	Triassic	
Ubagan Series Group/Kushmur Suite Formation	Jurassic	
Uzunbulak Suite Formation	Jurassic	
Zhalair Formation	Ordovician	
Zhalgyz Formation	Cambrian	
Zhirkindek Formation	Cretaceous	
Zhumabai Formation	Cambrian	
Zhuravlevskaya Formation	Cretaceous	

== See also ==
- Lists of fossiliferous stratigraphic units in Asia
- Lists of fossiliferous stratigraphic units in Europe
