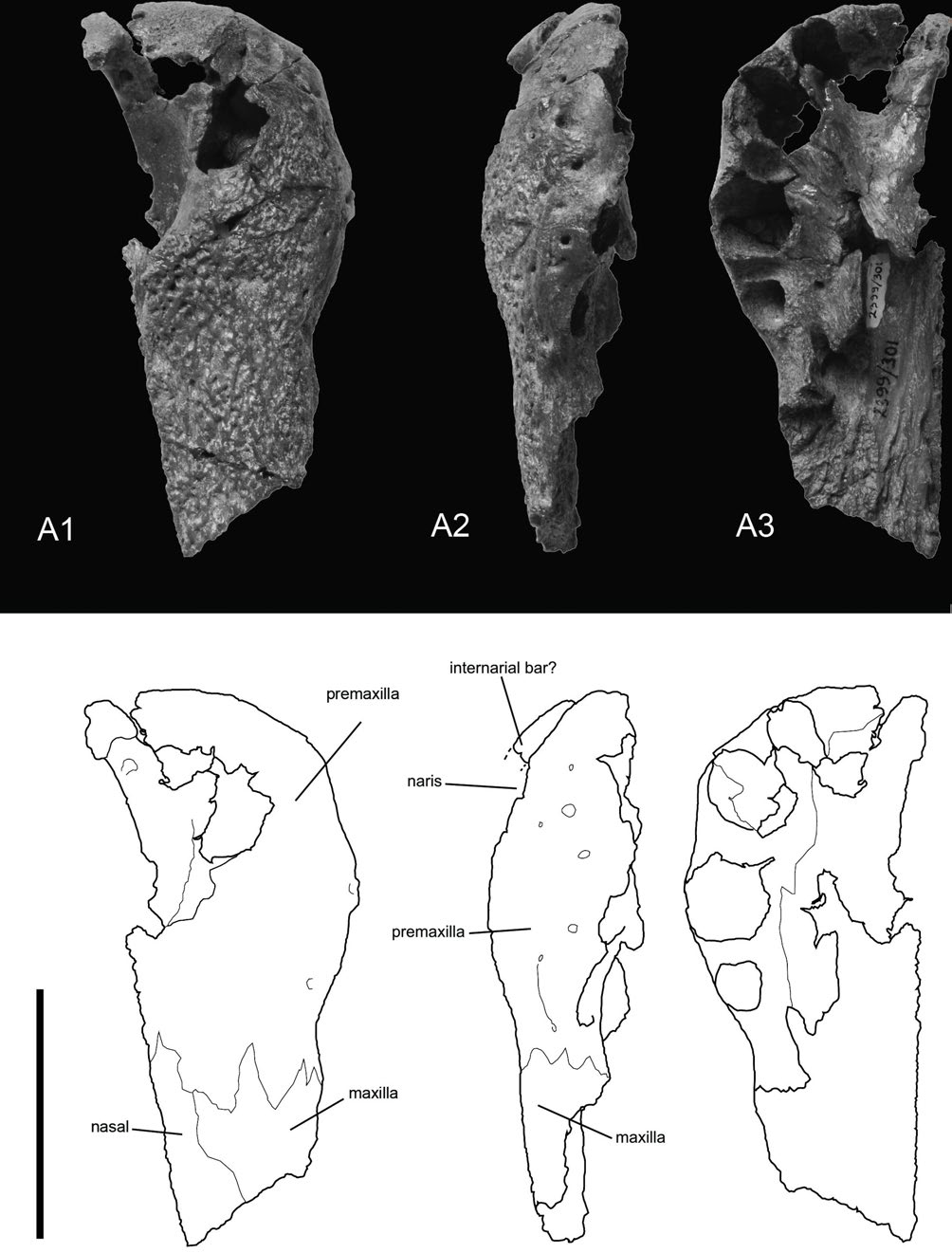
- Holotype premaxilla

Scientific classification
- Domain: Eukaryota
- Kingdom: Animalia
- Phylum: Chordata
- Class: Reptilia
- Clade: Archosauria
- Clade: Pseudosuchia
- Clade: Crocodylomorpha
- Clade: Crocodyliformes
- Family: †Paralligatoridae
- Genus: †Kansajsuchus; Efimov, 1975

Type species
- †Kansajsuchus extensus Efimov, 1975

= Kansajsuchus =

Kansajsuchus Temporal range: Late Cretaceous, 85 Ma

Extinct genus of reptiles

Kansajsuchus is an extinct genus of paralligatorid mesoeucrocodylian. It is based on PIN 2399/301, a right premaxilla, one of the bones of the tip of the snout. This specimen was found in rocks of the lower Santonian-age Upper Cretaceous Yalovach Svita of Kansai, in the Fergana Basin of Tajikistan. Additional fossils including vertebrae and bony armor have been assigned to this genus. It would have been a large animal, estimated at between 5–7 metres (16–23 ft) long. Kansajsuchus was described in 1975 by Mikhail Efimov. The type species is Kansajsuchus extensus.

== Classification ==
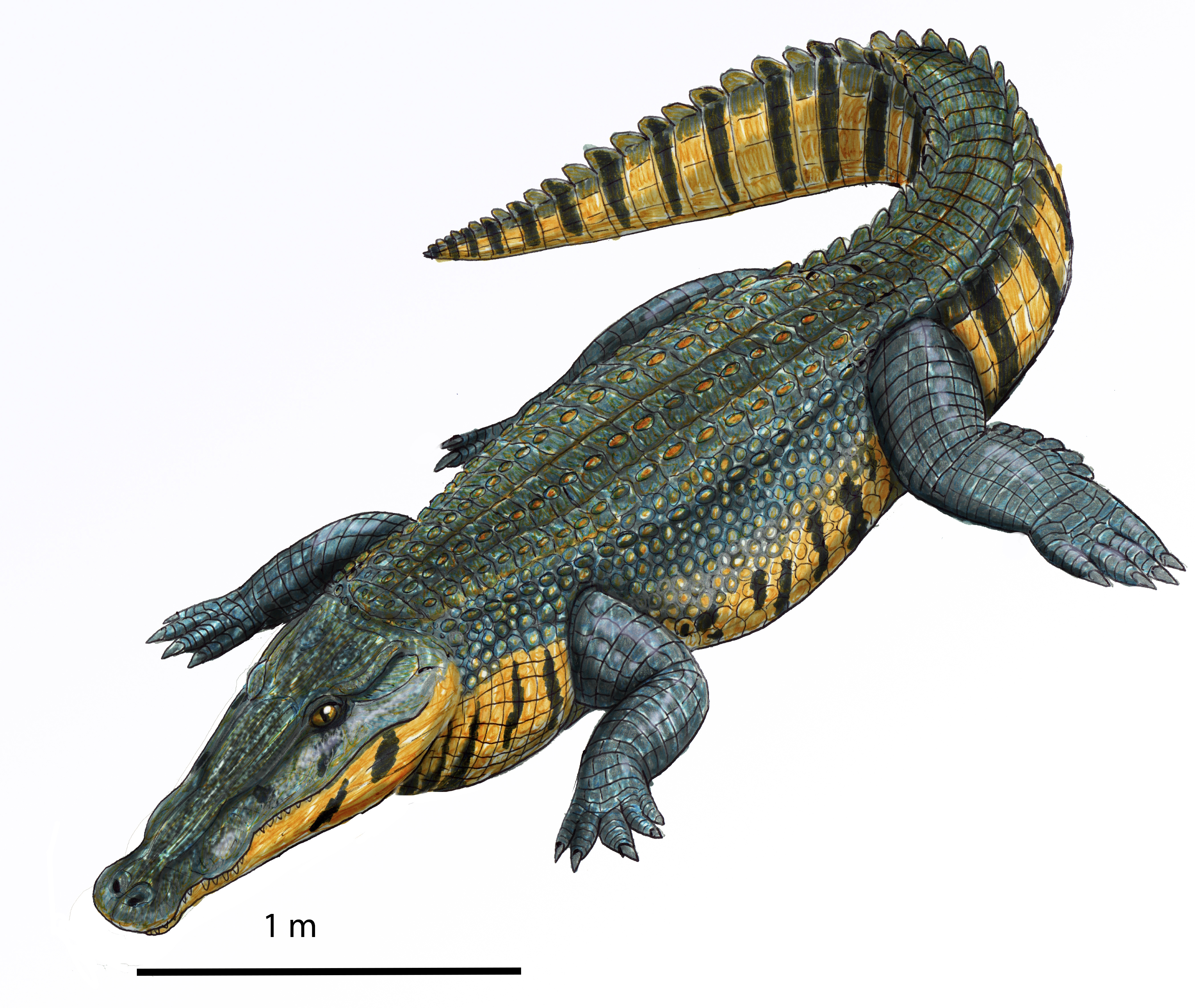
Life restoration

Halliday et al. (2013) confirmed the validity of the species K. extensus, and its phylogenetic position among other basal goniopholidids from Asia. "Sunosuchus" shartegensis was found to represent its sister taxon, and both species were placed in a distinct lineage from the type species of Sunosuchus, S. miaoi, however with a weak support. Therefore, the authors raised the suggestion that later revisions and phylogenetic analyses would result in the abandonment of the name Kansajsuchus, and a referral of its type species to Sunosuchus. However, a subsequent paper by Kuzmin et al. (2019) showed that Kansajsuchus is a member of the family Paralligatoridae.
