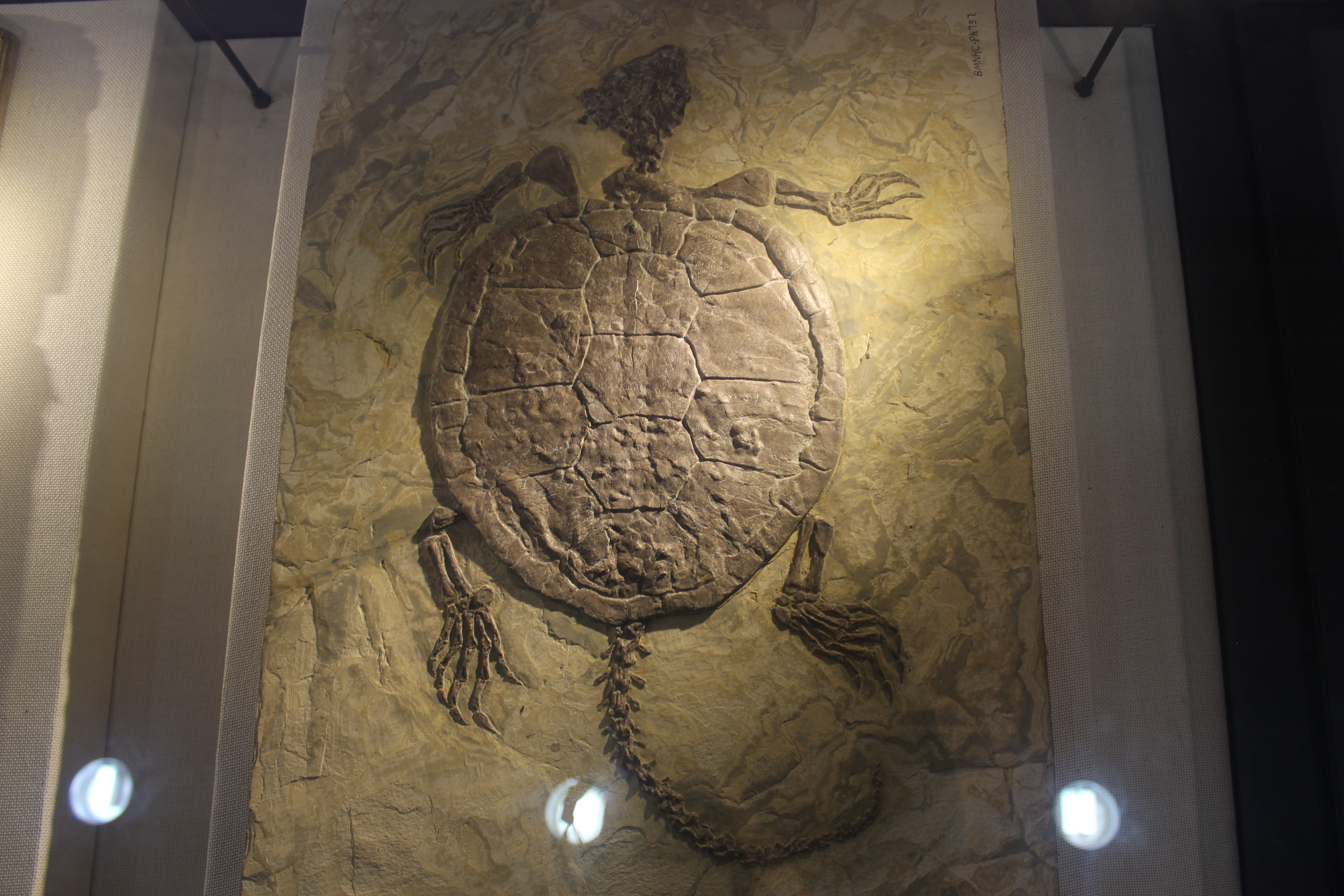
- Fossil specimen, Beijing Museum of Natural History

Scientific classification
- Domain: Eukaryota
- Kingdom: Animalia
- Phylum: Chordata
- Class: Reptilia
- Clade: Pantestudines
- Clade: Testudinata
- Family: †Sinemydidae
- Genus: †Manchurochelys; Endo & Shikama, 1942

Species
- †M. manchoukuoensis Endo & Shikama, 1942

= Manchurochelys =

Extinct genus of turtles

Manchurochelys is an extinct genus of turtle. It existed during the early Cretaceous of what is now northeast China. It has been found in the Jianshangou Bed of West Liaoning's Yixian Formation. However, it is a rarely found fossil.

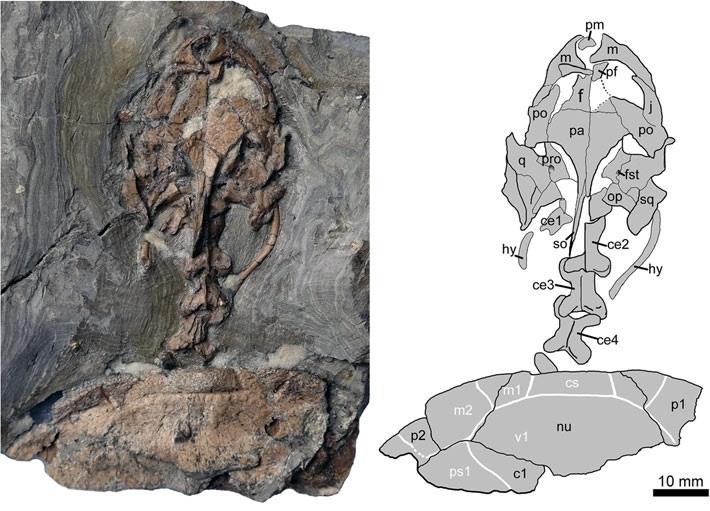
Skull and neck

Manchurochelys was first named by Endo and Shikama in 1942, and contains the single species, M. manchoukuoensis (sometimes misspelled M. manchouensis). A second species, M. liaoxensis, was named in 1995 but was later shown to be a species of Ordosemys. It has been occasionally placed in the family Sinemydidae, although it is said to more likely belong in the family Macrobaenidae.
