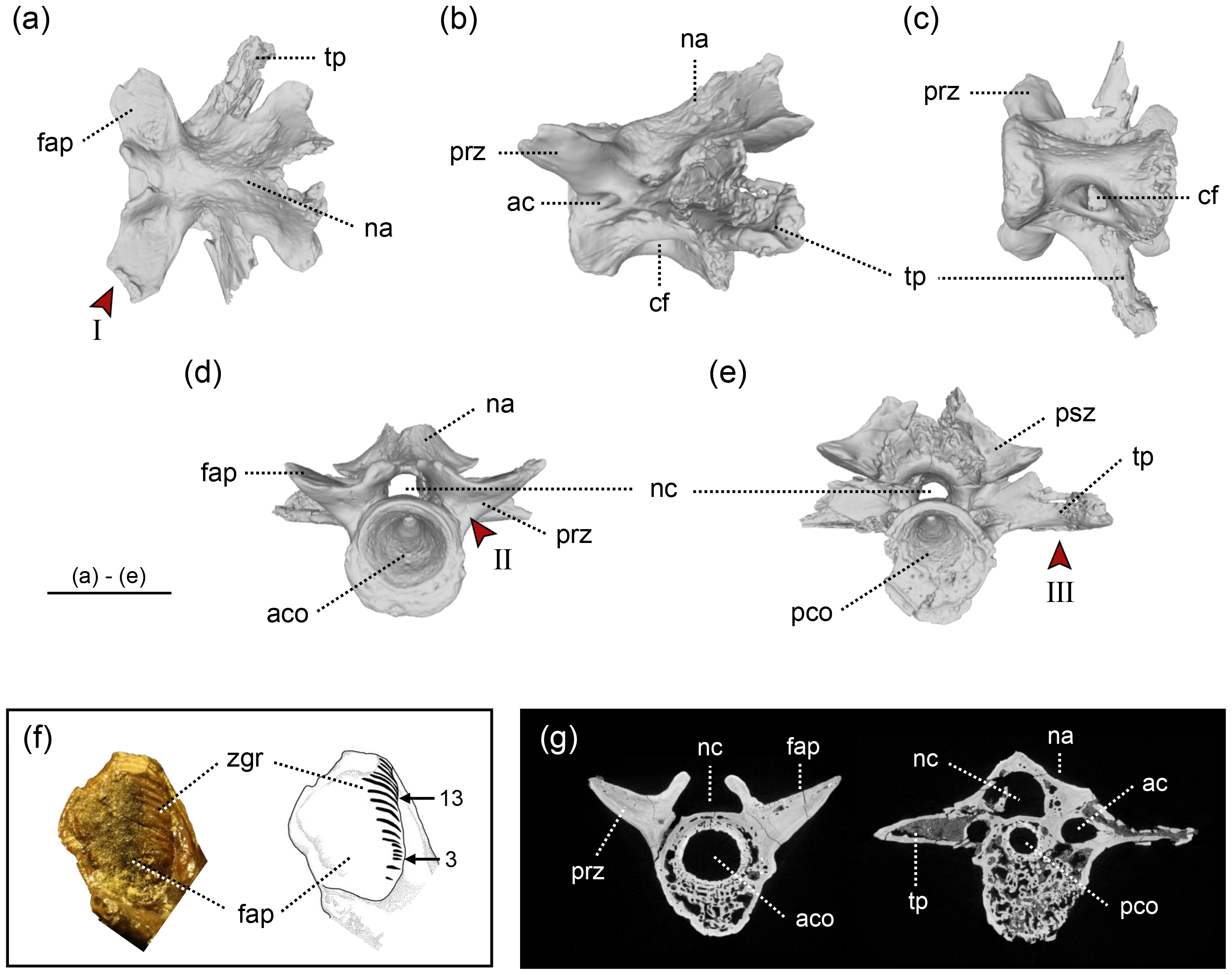
- Holotype vertebra, including growth rings (f) and CT scan cross-sections (g)

Scientific classification
- Kingdom: Animalia
- Phylum: Chordata
- Class: Amphibia
- Order: Urodela
- Family: Cryptobranchidae
- Genus: †Limnospondylus; Noda et al., 2026
- Species: †L. ajimuensis

Binomial name
- †Limnospondylus ajimuensis Noda et al., 2026

= Limnospondylus =

Limnospondylus Temporal range: Late Pliocene, ~3.5 Ma

Genus of extinct salamander

Limnospondylus (lit. 'lake vertebra') is an extinct genus of giant salamander (family Cryptobranchidae) known from the late Pliocene (~3.5 million years ago) Tsubusagawa Formation of Japan. The genus contains a single species, Limnospondylus ajimuensis, also called the Ajimu giant salamander, known from three isolated vertebrae. The largest of these suggests Limnospondylus may have reached a body length around 102–115 centimetres (40–45 in).

Limnospondylus coexisted with a variety of animals in a lake environment, including fish, crocodilians, turtles, birds, and mammals such as relatives of rhinoceros, elephants, and bears. Together, this ecosystem supports a fauna similar to that found in modern southern Asia.

== Discovery and naming ==
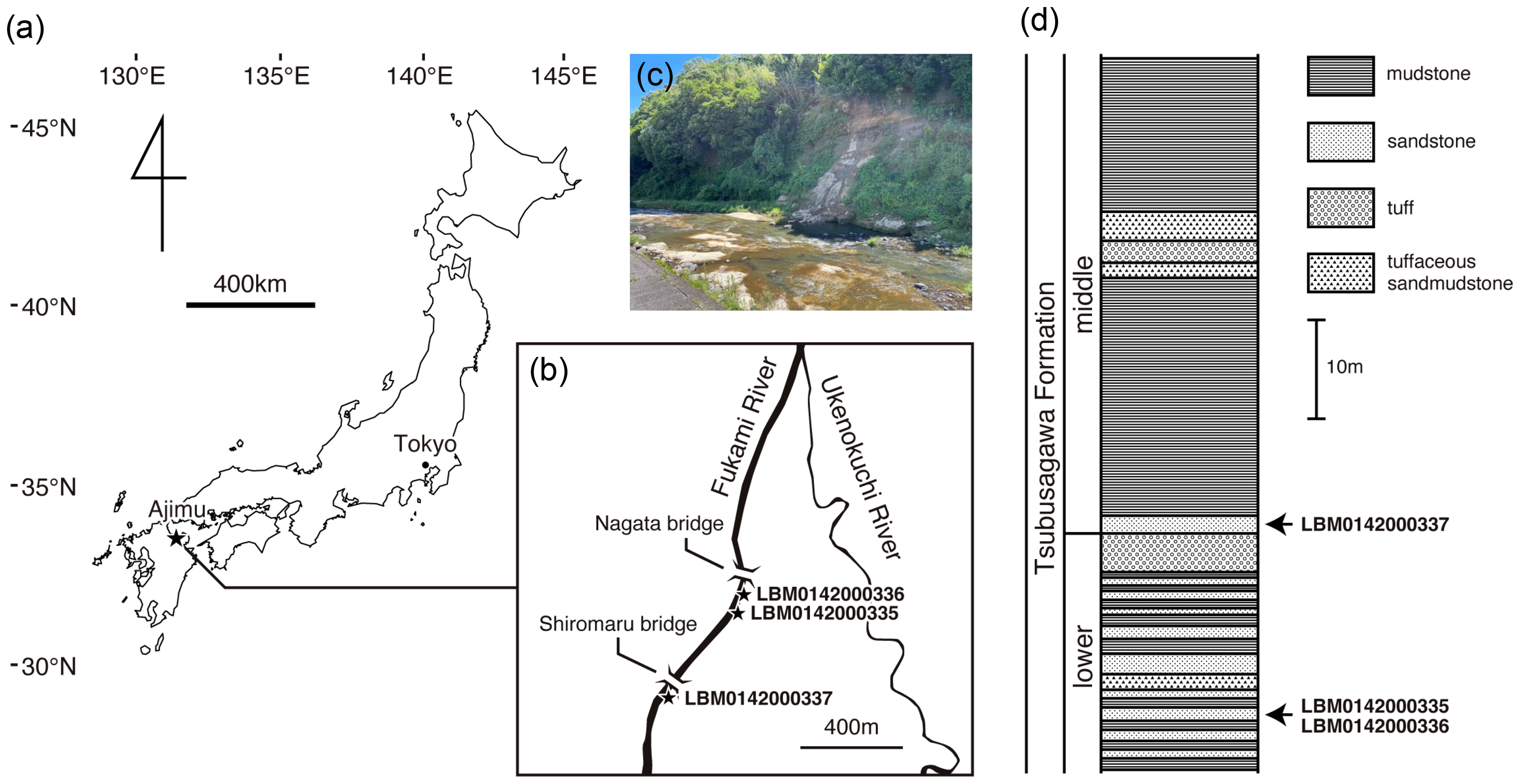
Discovery locality and stratigraphic position of the known fossils within the Tsubusagawa Formation

Throughout the mid-1990s, Eiichi Kitabayashi collected three isolated vertebrae from outcrops of the Tsubusagawa Formation along the Fukami River in Ajimu of Oita Prefecture in western Japan. These consisted of a mid-trunk vertebra in December 1995, a caudosacral vertebra in August 1996, and an anterior (toward the front) trunk vertebra in August 1997, all of which presumably belong to different individuals, with the first two deriving from the lower part of the formation and the third from the base of the middle part. Preliminary study identified them as species of the modern cryptobranchid genus Andrias. They are now housed in the Lake Biwa Museum in Shiga Prefecture, where they are accessioned as specimens LBM0142000335, LBM0142000336, and LBM0142000337, respectively.

In 2026, Masahiro Noda and colleagues described Limnospondylus ajimuensis as a new genus and species of cryptobranchid salamander based on these fossil remains, establishing LBM0142000335 as the holotype specimen. The other two vertebrae were referred to this species as paratypes. The generic name, Limnospondylus, combines the Greek words limne, meaning 'lake', and spondylos, meaning 'vertebra', referencing the depositional environment of the known material in a lacustrine region. The specific name, ajimuensis, references Ajimu, the type locality. The common name Ajimu giant salamander was used in reference to this species.

== Description ==
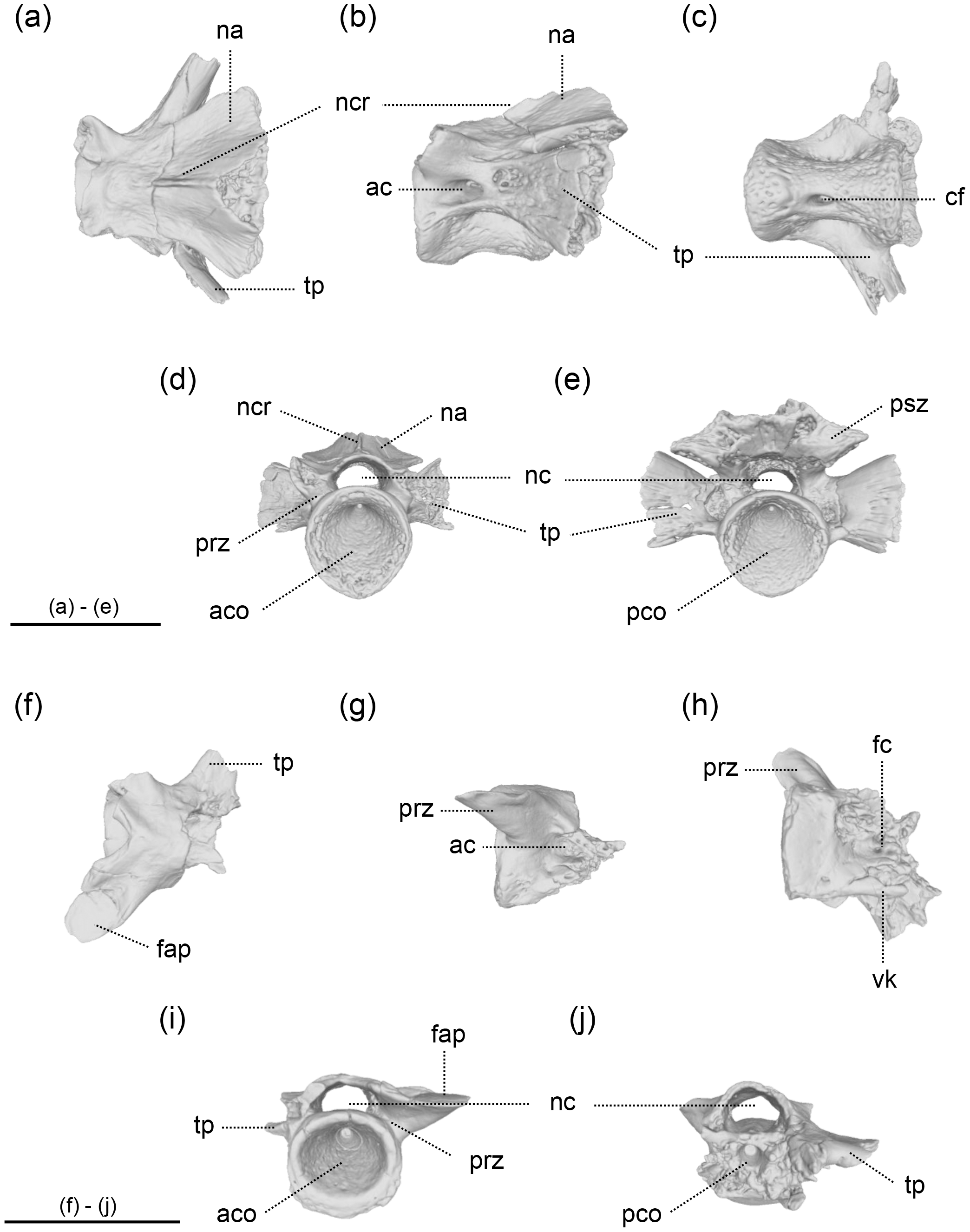
Anterior trunk (a–e) and caudosacral (f–j) vertebrae referred to L. ajimuensis

Using regression equations based on measurements of modern cryptobranchid salamanders (Andrias and Cryptobranchus), Noda et al. (2026) tentatively calculated the total length of Limnospondylus to be around 102–115 centimetres (40–45 in). The holotype vertebra has 17 or 18 growth rings visible on the zygapophyses (articular processes), indicating this individual may have lived at least 17 years. The uniform spacing of growth rings 1–13 implies that it reached sexual maturity after this time, after which the ring spacing narrows.

The vertebrae of Limnospondylus can be distinguished from all other cryptobranchids by having broad prezygapophyses with robust bases when seen from the front (anterior view), and ventral (toward the bottom) margins of the transverse processes forming a straight line when seen from the front or back. The vertebral centra are proportionally shorter from front to back and taller from top to bottom than modern cryptobranchids. The prezygapophyses have broad articular facets due to their lateral expansion, a feature also seen in the extinct cryptobranchid Aviturus from Mongolia, but it differs from this genus as it lacks an interzygapophyseal ridge.

== Paleoenvironment ==
Limnospondylus is known from the Tsubusagawa Formation, which dates to the late Pliocene (Piacenzian age), dated to about 3.5 million years ago. This formation preserves lacustrine (lake), fluvial (river), and marsh depositional environments in rocks with occaisional volcanic ash beds. Many fossil vertebrates are known from these layers, together comprising the "Ajimu fauna", which includes animals comparable to what is now found from southern China to Southeast Asia. Fish fossils include those of the families Bagridae (naked catfishes) and Cyprinidae (carp). Reptiles include crocodilians (Alligator sinensis, Toyotamaphimeia machikanensis, and a crocodylid) and turtles in the families Bataguridae, Platysternidae, and Trionychidae. Mammals include rodents, ursids (bears) rhinocerotids, the proboscidean (elephant relative) Stegodon miensis, and sambar deer (Rusa unicolor). Bird fossils of the clades Anseriformes, Falconiformes, Gruiformes, and Pelecaniformes are also known.
