= Tadzhikosuchus =

Tadzhikosuchus Temporal range: Turonian–Santonian

Scientific classification
- Domain: Eukaryota
- Kingdom: Animalia
- Phylum: Chordata
- Class: Reptilia
- Clade: Archosauria
- Clade: Pseudosuchia
- Clade: Crocodylomorpha
- Clade: Crocodyliformes
- Clade: Neosuchia
- Genus: †Tadzhikosuchus; Efimov, 1982

Type species
- †Tadzhikosuchus macrodentis Efimov, 1982

Extinct genus of reptiles

Tadzhikosuchus (also spelt Tajikosuchus) is an extinct genus of neosuchian crocodyliform from the Late Cretaceous of Tajikistan. Three species have been named: the type species T. macrodentis, described by Efimov in 1982 from the lower Santonian-age Upper Cretaceous Ialovachsk Formation of Kansai, Tajikistan, in the Fergana Basin of Tajikistan; T. neutralis from the same location, by Efimov in 1988; and T. kizylkumensis from Turonian-age rocks of the Upper Cretaceous Bissekty Formation of Dzharakhuduk, Uzbekistan, by Nesov and colleagues in 1989. However, a 2000 review by Glenn Storrs and Mikhail Efimov could not differentiate between the species based on their type material, and recommended grouping the specimens of all three species under T. macrodentis. They also could not determine how Tadzhikosuchus and the contemporaneous Zhyrasuchus were related, or even if they were synonyms, due to the poor fossils available. The name of Tadzhikosuchus is derived from the Russian spelling of Tajikistan.

To date, Tadzhikosuchus is mostly known from partial dentaries, which were initially considered to have been very similar to Prodiplocynodon (a crocodyloid) by Efimov. However, since dentaries are not known for Prodiplocynodon, this conclusion was considered questionable by Jeremy Martin and Massimo Delfino in 2010. They instead suggested that it may have belonged to the Paralligatoridae, which was common in Asia at the time.
