= Appalachemys =

Scientific classification
- Domain: Eukaryota
- Kingdom: Animalia
- Phylum: Chordata
- Class: Reptilia
- Clade: Pantestudines
- Clade: Testudinata
- Family: †Macrobaenidae
- Genus: †Appalachemys; Gentry, Kiernan & Parham, 2023

Type species
- †Appalachemys ebersolei

Genus of turtle

Appalachemys is an extinct genus of macrobaenid turtle that lived during the Late Cretaceous period. It is a monotypic genus known from a single species, A. ebersolei, which was named after Jun Ebersole.

== History and Description ==
Appalachemys is known from specimen ALMNH PV985.24 at the Alabama Museum of Natural History. The type locality is unknown.

Appalachemys is over 80 cm long.

== Distribution and habitat ==
Appalachemys lived in Alabama in the Cretaceous.
