= Eoscapherpeton =

Eoscapherpeton Temporal range: Late CretaceousCenomanian–Campanian

Scientific classification
- Kingdom: Animalia
- Phylum: Chordata
- Class: Amphibia
- Order: Urodela
- Family: Cryptobranchidae
- Genus: †Eoscapherpeton; Nessov, 1981

Type species
- Eoscapherpeton asiaticum Nessov, 1981

Synonyms
- Mynbulakia Nessov, 1981

Extinct genus of salamanders

Eoscapherpeton is an extinct genus of giant salamander, known from the Late Cretaceous of Central Asia. Fossils have been found in the Cenomanian aged Khodzhakul Formation and Dzharakuduk Formation, Turonian aged Bissekty Formation and the Coniacian-Santonian aged Aitym Formation of Uzbekistan, the Santonian aged Yalovach Formation of Tajikistan, and the Santonian-lower Campanian aged Bostobe Formation and Campanian aged Darbasa Formation of Kazakhstan.

== See also ==
- Prehistoric amphibian
- List of prehistoric amphibians
