= Ialovachsk Formation =

Late Cretaceous geologic formation in Central Asia

- Stratigraphic range: Santonian; 85 Ma
- Type: Geological formation

Lithology
- Primary: Sandstone
- Other: Conglomerate

Location
- Coordinates: 40.2°N 71.7°E
- Approximate paleocoordinates: 34.9°N 65.8°E
- Region: Jalal-Abad, Osh; Sughd; Fergana
- Country: Kyrgyzstan, Tajikistan, Uzbekistan
- Extent: Fergana Valley & Range
- Ialovachsk Formation (Kyrgyzstan)

The Ialovachsk or Yalovach Formation is a geologic formation in Kyrgyzstan, Tajikistan and Uzbekistan dating to the Santonian age of the Cretaceous period.

== Fossil content ==
Fossil dinosaur eggs as well as pterosaur, dinosaur, turtle and crocodyliforme remains have been recovered from the formation.

The following fossils have been reported from the formation:

Amphibians

- Eopelobates sp.
- Eoscapherpeton superum

Mammals

- ?Kulbeckia kulbecke

Snakes

- Squamata indet.

Turtles

- Adocus foveatus
- Anatolemys maximus
- Lindholmemys gravis
- Shachemys baibolatica
- Trionyx kansaiensis
- T. riabinini

Dinosaurs

- cf. Alectrosaurus sp.
- Ankylosauridae indet.
- ?Ceratopsidae indet.
- Dromaeosauridae indet.
- Hadrosauridae indet.
- cf. Hypsilophodontidae indet.
- Kansaignathus sogdianus
- ?Neoceratopsia indet.
- Neosauropoda indet.
- Ornithomimidae indet.
- ?Oviraptoridae indet.
- Therizinosauridae indet.
- ?Theropoda indet.
- Troodontidae indet.
- Tyrannosauridae indet.

Other archosaurs

- Azhdarchidae indet.
- ?Azhdarcho sp.
- Aves indet.
- Kansajsuchus extensus
- ?Pterosauria indet.
- Tadzhikosuchus macrodentis

== See also ==
- List of dinosaur-bearing rock formations
  - List of stratigraphic units with dinosaur trace fossils
    - Dinosaur eggs
