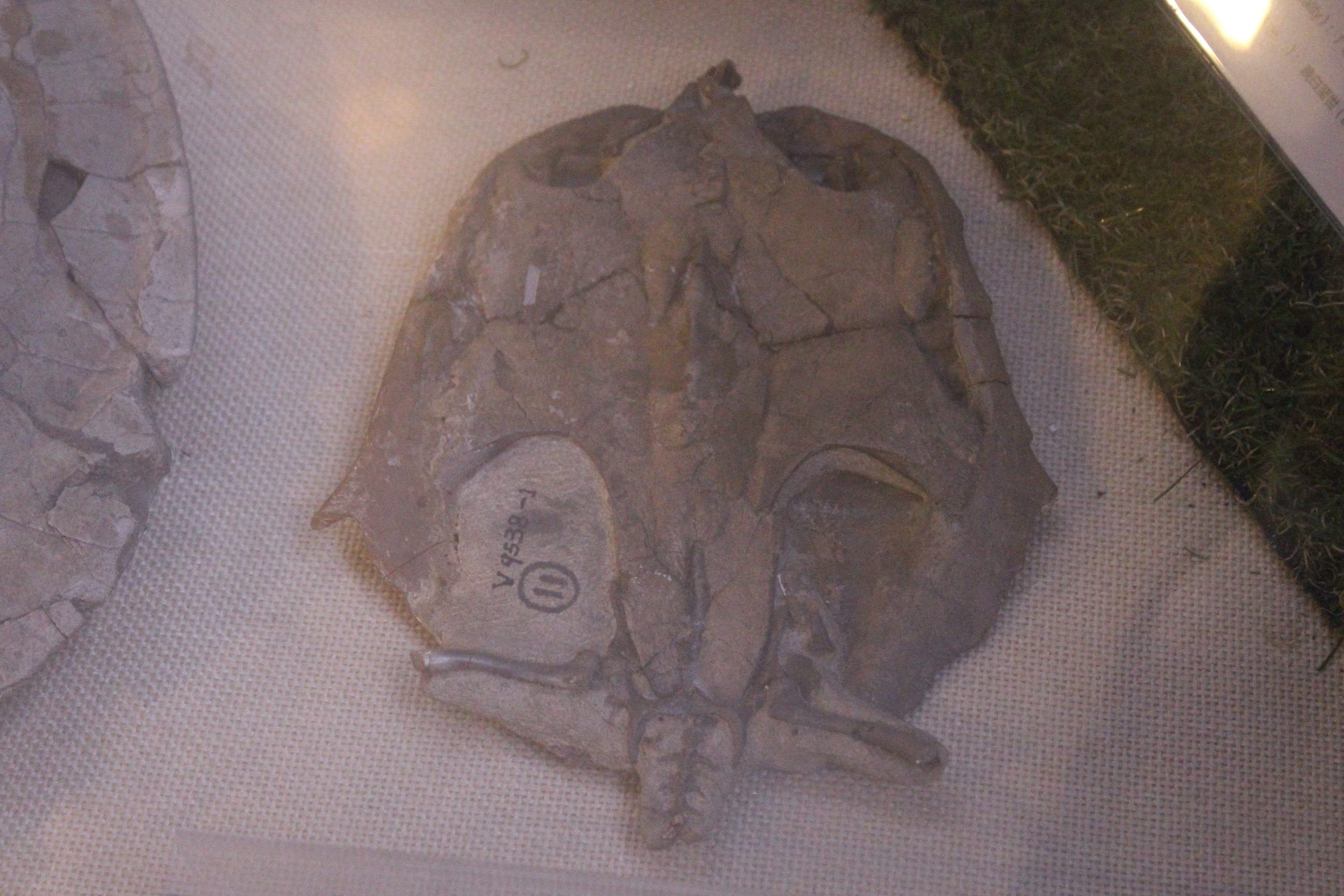
- Holotype carapace and plastron (IVPP V9538) of S. brevispinus, Paleozoological Museum of China

Scientific classification
- Kingdom: Animalia
- Phylum: Chordata
- Class: Reptilia
- Clade: Pantestudines
- Clade: Testudinata
- Family: †Sinemydidae
- Genus: †Sinemys; Wiman, 1930

Species
- S. lens Wiman, 1930 (type); S. brevispinus Tong and Brinkman, 2013; S. chabuensis Ji and Chen, 2018; S. gamera Brinkman and Peng, 1993

= Sinemys =

Sinemys Temporal range: Late Jurassic to Early Cretaceous

Extinct genus of turtles

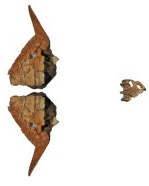
S. gamera fossil

Sinemys is an extinct genus of turtle from the Late Jurassic to Early Cretaceous of China. Three species have been named: S. lens, the type species, from the Kimmeridgian-Tithonian of Shandong; S. gamera (Japanese: シネミス・ガメラ) (named after the movie monster of the same name), from the Valanginian-Albian of Nei Mongol, and S. brevispinus from Early Cretaceous of Nei Mongol. S. wuerhoensis, from the Aptian-Albian of Xinjiang, is not referrable to this genus. Specimen that may be belong to this genus were also known from Japan, although later abstract considered it as indeterminate sinemydid. The species S. gamera is noted for the presence of a pair of elongate spines projecting outwards and backwards from seventh costal of the carapace. These may have served a hydrodynamic function.

== See also ==
- Gamerabaena – prehistoric turtle genus also named after the kaiju Gamera
