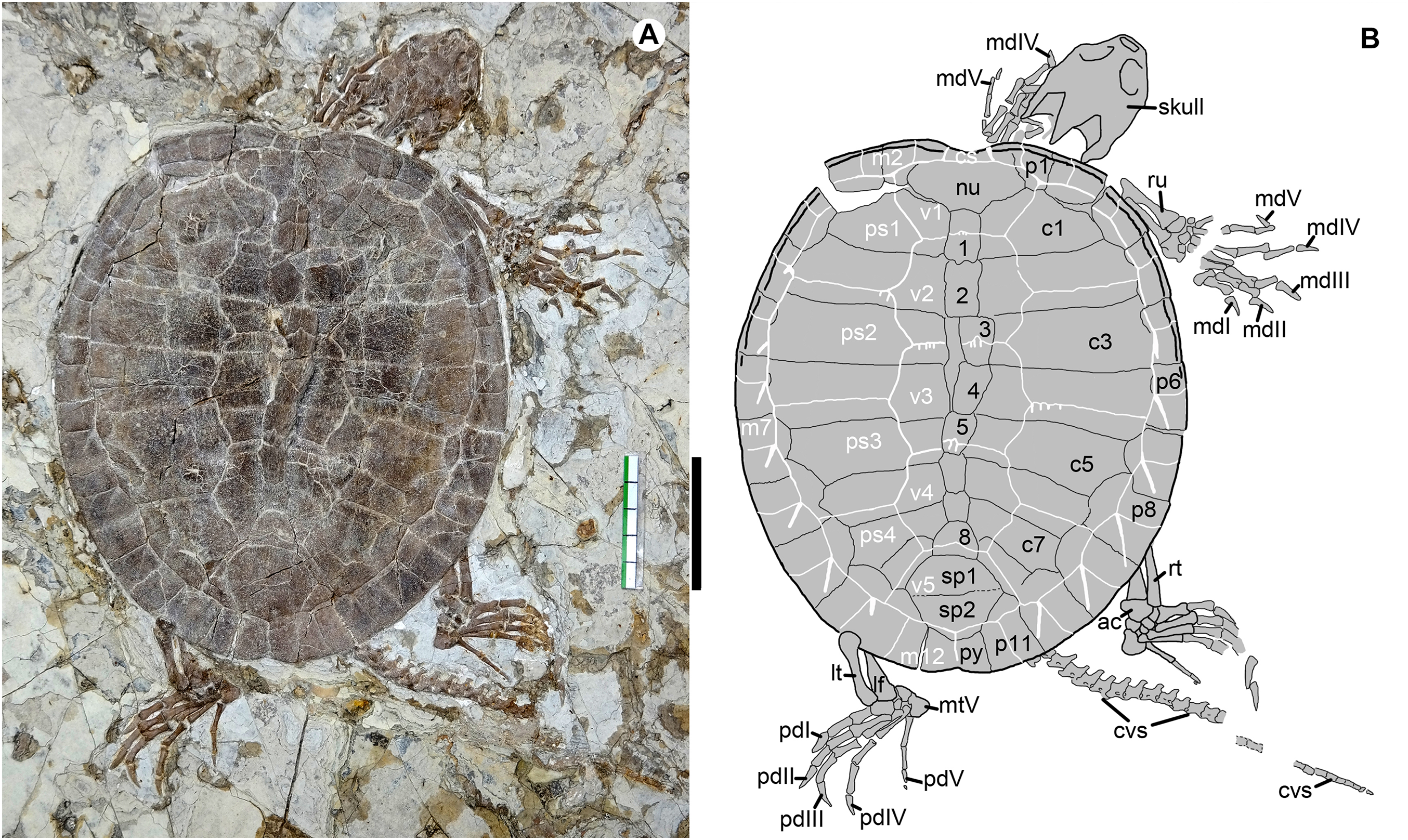
- Jeholochelys
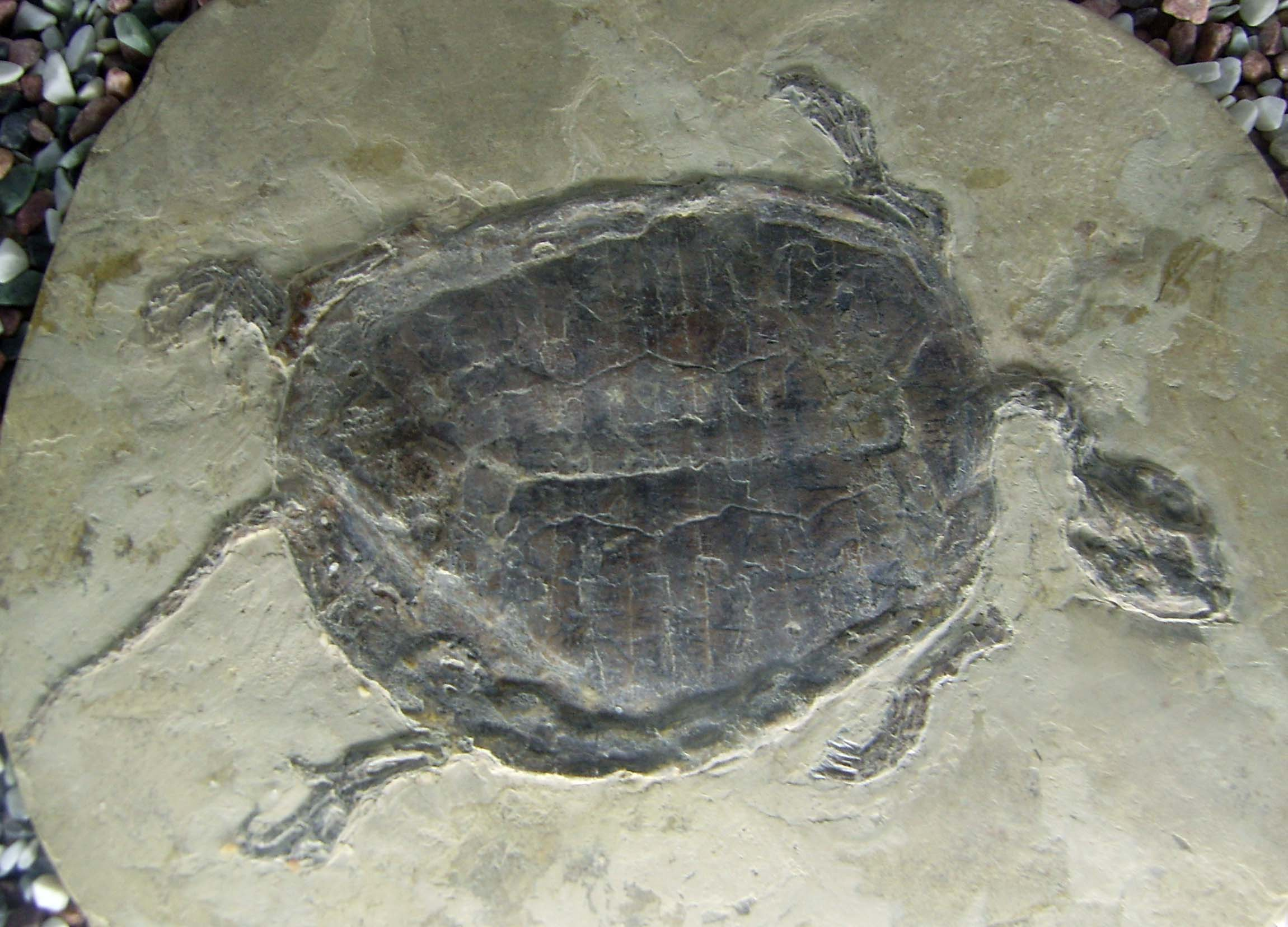
- Ordosemys

Scientific classification
- Kingdom: Animalia
- Phylum: Chordata
- Clade: Pantestudines
- Clade: Testudinata
- Clade: Perichelydia
- Family: †Sinemydidae; Yeh, 1963

Genera
- See text

= Sinemydidae =

Sinemydidae Temporal range: Oxfordian–Santonian

Extinct family of turtles

Sinemydidae is an extinct family of turtles from the Jurassic and Cretaceous of East Asia. Their exact position is engimatic, they have alternatively been considered stem-group cryptodires, but also "crownward stem-turtles" alongside Macrobaenidae, Paracryptodira, Xinjiangchelyidae, Thalassochelydia and Sandownidae outside of crown Testudines.

== Genera ==
- Dracochelys Lianmugin Formation, China, Early Cretaceous (Aptian-Albian)
- Hongkongochelys Upper Shaximiao Formation, China, Middle-Late Jurassic
- Jeholochelys Jiufotang Formation, China, Early Cretaceous (Aptian)
- Liaochelys Jiufotang Formation, China, Early Cretaceous (Aptian)
- Manchurochelys Yixian Formation, China, Early Cretaceous (Aptian)
- Ordosemys
  - O. leios Luohandong Formation, China, Early Cretaceous
  - O. liaoxiensis Chengzihe Formation, China, Early Cretaceous (Aptian)
  - O. brinkmania Lianmugin Formation, China, Early Cretaceous (Aptian-Albian)
  - O. perforata Khulsangol Formation, Mongolia, Early Cretaceous (Albian)
  - O. donghai Chengzihe Formation, China, Early Cretaceous (Aptian-Albian)
- Sinemys
  - †Sinemys brevispinus Tong and Brinkman 2012 Laohongdong Formation, China, Early Cretaceous
  - †Sinemys chabuensis Ji and Chen 2018 Jingchuan Formation, China, Early Cretaceous (Barremian)
  - †Sinemys gamera Brinkman and Peng 1993 Luohandong Formation, China, Early Cretaceous (Valanginian-Hauterivian)
  - †Sinemys lens Wiman 1930 Mengyin Formation, China, Early Cretaceous (Berriasian-Valanginian)
- Wuguia
  - †Wuguia efremovi Khozatsky 1996 Hutubei Formation, China, Hauterivian/Barremian Lianmuxin Formation, China, Early Cretaceous (Aptian-Albian)
  - †Wuguia hutubeiensis Matzke et al. 2004 Hutubei Formation, China, Hauterivian/Barremian
- Xiaochelys Lianmugin Formation, China, Early Cretaceous (Aptian-Albian)
- Yumenemys Hui-Hui-P'u, China, Late Cretaceous

Material from the Paleocene of California previously attributed to c.f. Sinemyididae is now attributed to macrobaenids.

== Phylogeny ==
Cladogram of Perichelydia after Miller et al. 2023, showing the two proposed positions of Sinemydidae.

- Perichelydia
  - †Mongolochelys
  - - †Meiolaniformes (Meiolania)
    - - †Paracryptodira
      - - †Sinemydidae+†Xinjiangchelyidae?
        - - - †Protostegidae?
            - †Thalassochelydia
          - - Pleurodira (side-necked turtles)
            - Pan‑Cryptodira
              - †Sinemydidae+†Xinjiangchelyidae?
              - Cryptodira (hidden-neck turtles)
                - Pan-Trionychia (soft-shelled and pig-nosed turtles)
                - - Pan-Testudinoidea (tortoises, pond turtles/terrapins, etc)
                  - - Pan-Chelonioidea (sea turtles, possibly including †Protostegidae)
                    - - Pan-Kinosternoidea (musk turtles, hickatee, etc)
                      - Chelydridae (snapping turtles)
