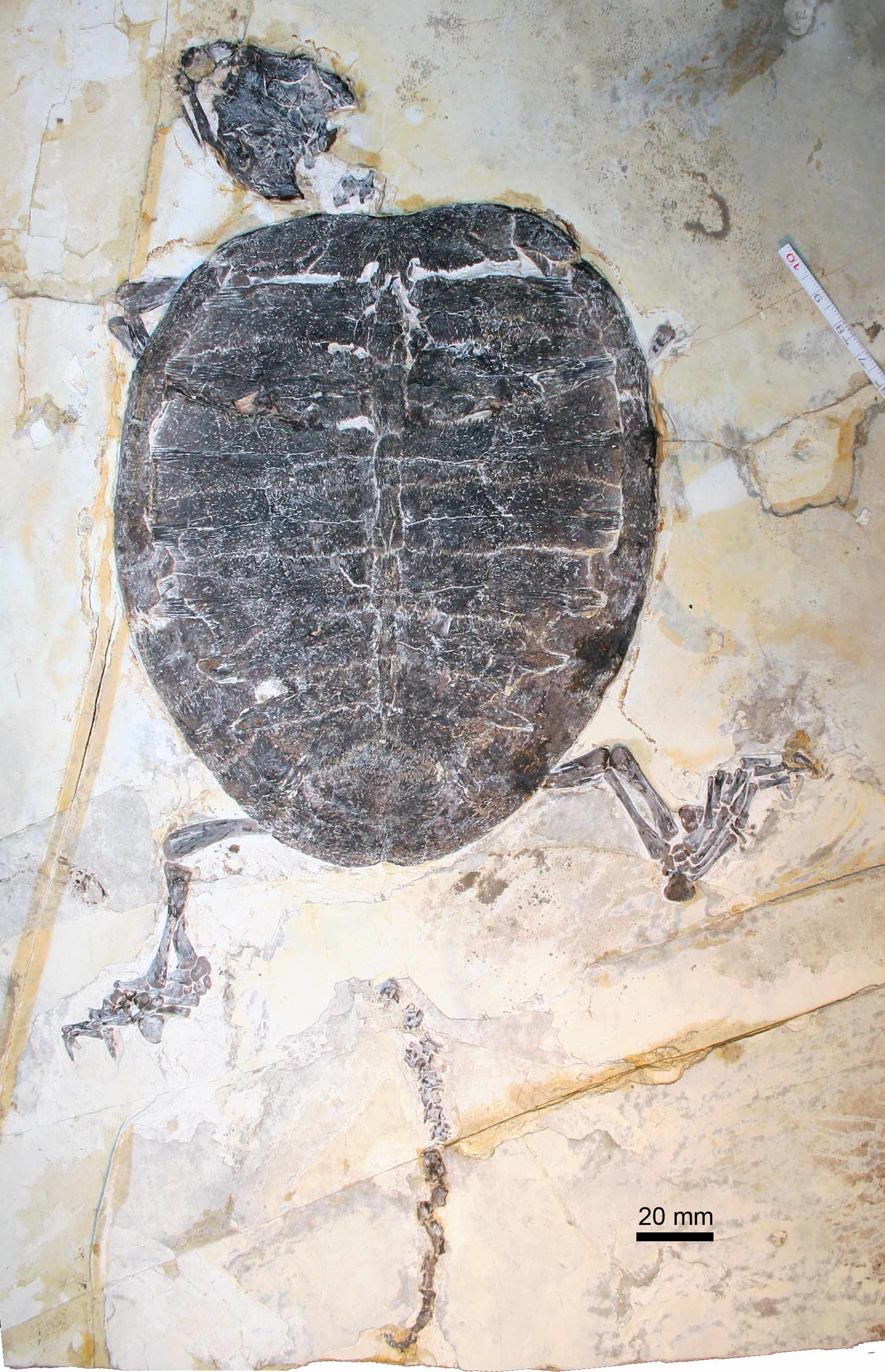

Scientific classification
- Kingdom: Animalia
- Phylum: Chordata
- Clade: Pantestudines
- Clade: Testudinata
- Family: †Sinemydidae
- Genus: †Liaochelys; Zhou, 2010

Species
- L. jianchangensis Zhou, 2010 (type)

= Liaochelys =

Liaochelys Temporal range: Early Cretaceous

Extinct genus of turtles

Liaochelys is an extinct genus of sinemydid turtle which existed in western Liaoning, China during the early Cretaceous epoch. It was first named by Chang-Fu Zhou in 2010 and the type species is Liaochelys jianchangensis.
