= Ukrainurus =

Ukrainurus Temporal range: Miocene

Scientific classification
- Kingdom: Animalia
- Phylum: Chordata
- Class: Amphibia
- Order: Urodela
- Clade: Pancryptobrancha
- Genus: †Ukrainurus; Vasilyan et al., 2013

Type species
- †Ukrainurus hypsognathus Vasilyan et al., 2013

Extinct genus of salamanders

Ukrainurus is an extinct genus of pancryptobranchan salamander known from the Miocene of Hrytsiv locality, Ukraine. It contains a single species, Ukrainurus hypsognathus.
