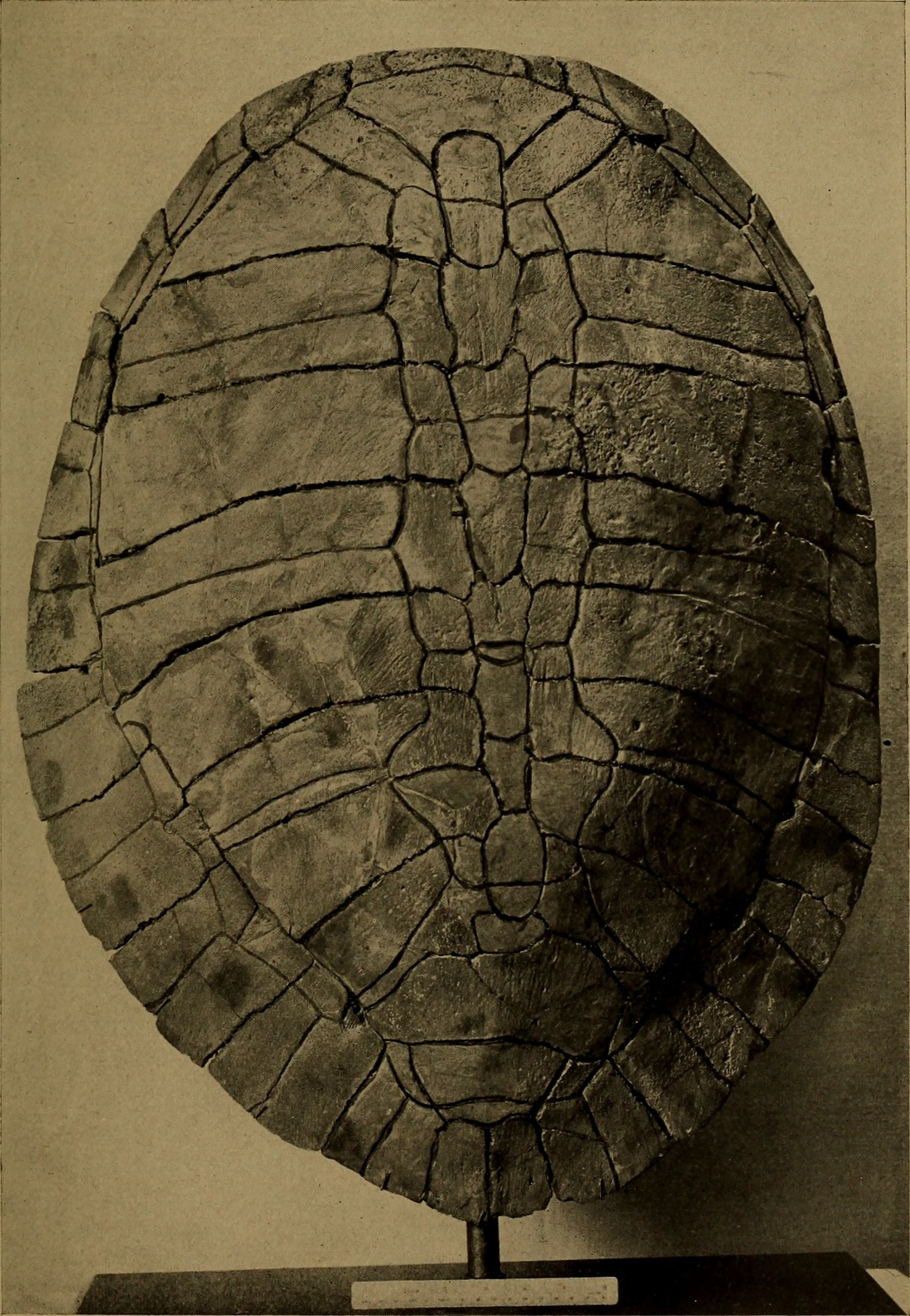
- Osteopygis emarginatus carapace

Scientific classification
- Domain: Eukaryota
- Kingdom: Animalia
- Phylum: Chordata
- Class: Reptilia
- Clade: Pantestudines
- Clade: Testudinata
- Family: †Macrobaenidae
- Genus: †Osteopygis; Cope, 1868

Type species
- Osteopygis emarginatus Cope, 1868

Species
- O. emarginatus Cope, 1868; O. backmani Russell, 1934; O. kranzi Weems, 2014; O. russelli Brinkman, 2015

= Osteopygis =

Osteopygis Temporal range: Late Cretaceous – Eocene, 70.6–48.6 Ma

Extinct genus of turtles

Osteopygis is a genus of extinct turtle. Osteopygis, as traditionally seen, is a chimera: the postcrania (including the holotype) belong to a non-marine stem-cryptodire, whilst the crania belong to sea turtles. In 2005, the referred material was split between two taxa: the postcrania remained in Osteopygis, while the crania were reassigned to Euclastes wielandi.
