= Aurorachelys =

Aurorachelys Temporal range: Turonian, 92 Ma

Scientific classification
- Kingdom: Animalia
- Phylum: Chordata
- Class: Reptilia
- Clade: Pantestudines
- Clade: Testudinata
- Family: †Macrobaenidae
- Genus: †Aurorachelys; Vandermark et al., 2009
- Species: †A. gaffneyi

Binomial name
- †Aurorachelys gaffneyi Vandermark et al., 2009

Extinct genus of turtles

Aurorachelys is an extinct genus of turtle which existed in Canada (Nunavut) during the late Cretaceous period, containing a single species, A. gaffneyi. The type specimen is UR 06.085 at the University of Rochester.
