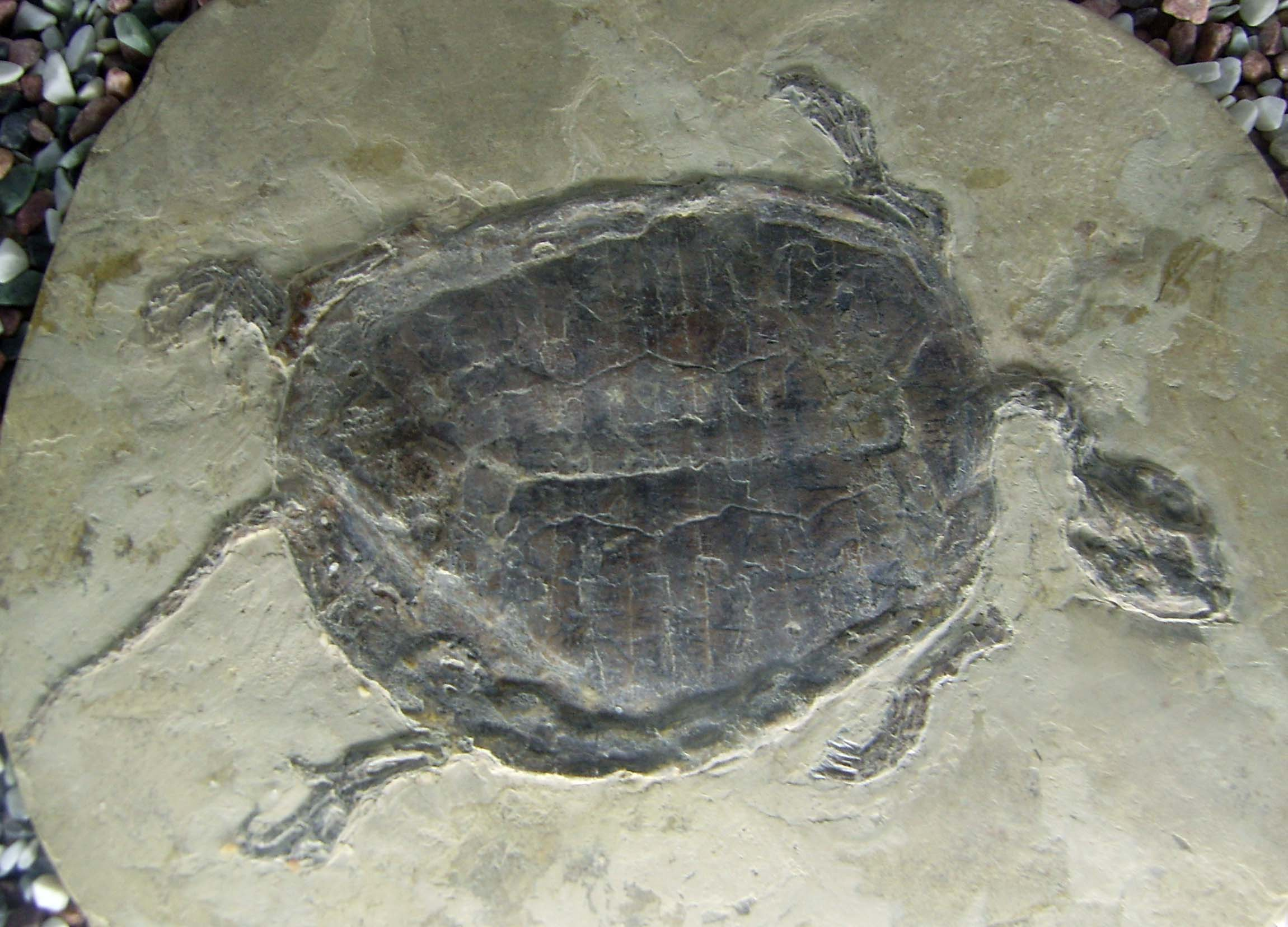
- Ordosemys liaoxiensis

Scientific classification
- Domain: Eukaryota
- Kingdom: Animalia
- Phylum: Chordata
- Class: Reptilia
- Clade: Pantestudines
- Clade: Testudinata
- Family: †Sinemydidae
- Genus: †Ordosemys; Brinkman & Peng, 1994

Species
- O. brinkmania; O. leios; O. liaoxiensis; O. perforata

= Ordosemys =

Ordosemys Temporal range: Early Cretaceous

Extinct genus of turtles

Ordosemys is an extinct genus of turtle from the Cretaceous period.
