= Bostobe Formation =

Stratigraphic Unit in Kazakhstan

- Stratigraphic range: Santonian-early Campanian; ~85 Ma
- Type: Geological formation
- Underlies: Akzhar Formation
- Overlies: Zhirkindek Formation
- Thickness: About 45 m (148 ft)

Lithology
- Primary: Sandstone
- Other: Claystone

Location
- Coordinates: 45.9°N 64.7°E
- Approximate paleocoordinates: 38.7°N 58.0°E
- Region: Qaraghandy & Qyzylorda
- Country: Kazakhstan

Type section
- Named for: Bostobe River
- Bostobe Formation (Kazakhstan)

The Bostobe Formation (Kazakh: Boztóbe svıtasy) is a geological formation in Qaraghandy & Qyzylorda, Kazakhstan whose strata date back to the Late Cretaceous (Santonian to early Campanian stages, approximately 85 Ma).

The sandstones and claystones of the formation were deposited in estuarine, fluvial-lacustrine and fluvial-deltaic environments.

Dinosaur remains are among the fossils that have been recovered from the formation. The formation is about 45 metres (148 ft) thick and consists primarily of clay with interbeds of sand, representing an estuarine environment.

== Fossil content ==
Khunnuchelys lophorhothon, a trionychid turtle recovered from the formation, was initially thought to belong to a hadrosaurid dinosaur and classified as cf. Lophorhothon sp.

Mammals

- Beleutinus orlovi
- Zhalmouzia bazhanovi
- Parazhelestes sp.

Ankylosaurs

- Ankylosauridae indet.

Ornithopods

- Aralosaurus tuberiferus
- Arstanosaurus akkurganensis
- Batyrosaurus rozhdestvenskyi

Sauropods

- Opisthocoelicaudiinae Indet.
- Titanosauridae indet.
- Sauropoda indet.

Theropods

- Caenagnathidae indet.
- Troodontidae indet.
- Therizinosauria indet.
- Ornithomimidae indet.
- Tyrannosauroidea indet.

Pterosaurs

- Aralazhdarcho bostobensis
- Samrukia nessovi

Turtles

- Adocus foveatus
- Anatolemys maximus
- Khunnuchelys lophorhothon
- Lindholmemys gravis
- Shachemys baibolatica
- Trionyx kansaiensis, T. onomatoplokos, T. riabinini

Other reptiles

- Bishara backa

Amphibians

- Anura indet.
- Eoscapherpeton

Fish

- Gobiates sp.

Flora

- Ulmaceae indet.

== See also ==
- List of dinosaur-bearing rock formations
- List of fossiliferous stratigraphic units in Kazakhstan
- Bissekty Formation
- Madygen Formation
- Karabastau Formation
- Kugitang Svita
