= Konsoy =

Konsoy Russian: Кансай Tajik: Консой
- Location in Tajikistan
- Coordinates: 40°29′34″N 69°42′9″E
- Country: Tajikistan
- Region: Sughd Region
- City: Guliston

Population (2020)
  - Total: 6,000

Konsoy (Tajik: Консой, Russian: Кансай, also Kaindisoy) is a town in northern Tajikistan. It is located in Sughd Region. It is part of the city of Guliston, and its population is 6,000 (2020).
