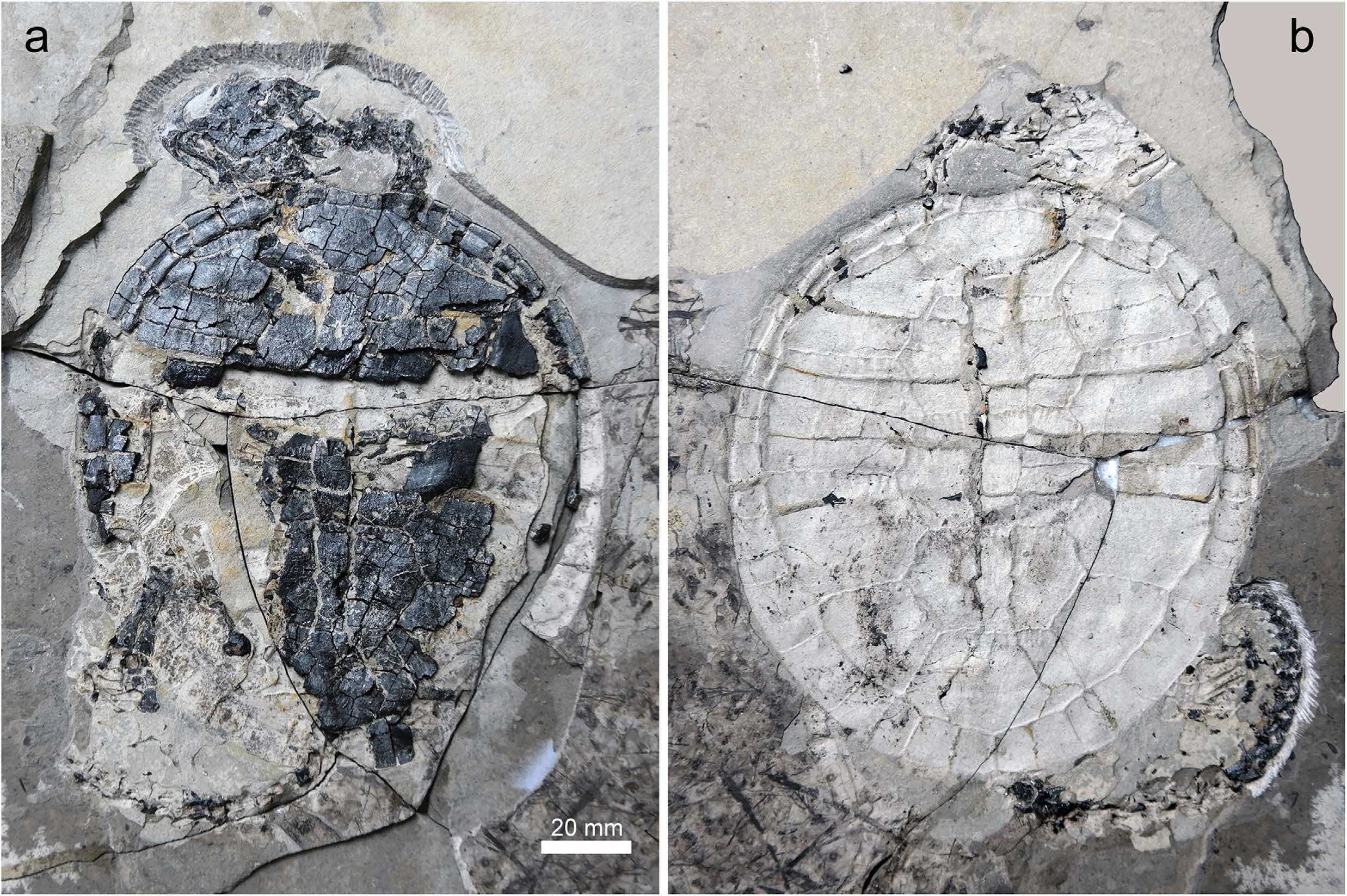
- Positive and counter part of the holotype from Ningcheng, northeastern China

Scientific classification
- Kingdom: Animalia
- Phylum: Chordata
- Class: Reptilia
- Clade: Pantestudines
- Clade: Testudinata
- Family: †Sinemydidae
- Genus: †Xiaochelys; Zhou and Rabi, 2015

Type species
- Xiaochelys ningchengensis Zhou and Rabi, 2015

= Xiaochelys =

Xiaochelys Temporal range: Early Cretaceous

Extinct genus of turtles

Xiaochelys is an extinct genus of sinemydid turtle that lived in China during the Early Cretaceous epoch. It is known from a single species, X. ningchengensis.
