= 2015 in reptile paleontology =

This list of fossil reptiles described in 2015 is a list of new taxa of fossil reptiles that were described during the year 2015, as well as other significant discoveries and events related to reptile paleontology that occurred in 2015.

== Ichthyosauromorphs ==
=== Research ===
- A study of phylogenetic relationships of ichthyopterygians is published by Ji et al. (2015); the authors introduced a new name, Grippioidea, for the clade containing the last common ancestor of Utatsusaurus hataii and Grippia longirostris, and all its descendants.
- An exceptionally large ichthyosaur radius, possibly belonging to a member of Shastasauridae (which, if confirmed, would indicate that members of the family survived until Early Jurassic) is described from the Hettangian Blue Lias Formation (south Wales, United Kingdom) by Martin et al. (2015).

=== New taxa ===
| Name | Novelty | Status | Authors | Age | Unit | Location | Notes | Images |
|---|---|---|---|---|---|---|---|---|
| Cartorhynchus | Gen. et sp. nov | Valid | Motani et al. | Early Triassic (Olenekian) | Nanlinghu Formation | China | A relative of ichthyopterygians. The type species is Cartorhynchus lenticarpus. Published online in 2014; the final version of the article naming it was published in 2015. | |
| Dearcmhara | Gen. et sp. nov | Valid | Brusatte et al. | Jurassic (Toarcian–Bajocian) | | United Kingdom | A basal member of Neoichthyosauria. The type species is Dearcmhara shawcrossi. | |
| Eretmorhipis | Gen. et sp. nov | Valid | Chen et al. | Early Triassic (late Spathian) | Jialingjiang Formation | China | A hupehsuchian. The type species is Eretmorhipis carrolldongi. | |
| Ichthyosaurus anningae | Sp. nov | Valid | Lomax & Massare | Early Jurassic (Hettangian/Sinemurian–Pliensbachian) | | United Kingdom | A species of Ichthyosaurus. | |
| Muiscasaurus | Gen. et sp. nov | Valid | Maxwell et al. | Early Cretaceous (Barremian–Aptian) | Paja Formation | Colombia | A member of Ophthalmosauridae. The type species is Muiscasaurus catheti. | |

== Sauropterygians ==
=== Research ===
- A study on the growth patterns and strategies of placodonts is published by Klein et al. (2015).
- A study on the sexual selection and dimorphism in Keichousaurus hui is published by Motani et al. (2015).
- A study on the teeth replacement patterns during the ontogeny in pliosaurids is published by Sassoon, Foffa & Marek (2015).

=== New taxa ===
| Name | Novelty | Status | Authors | Age | Unit | Location | Notes | Images |
|---|---|---|---|---|---|---|---|---|
| Anguanax | Gen. et sp. nov | Valid | Cau & Fanti | Late Jurassic (Oxfordian) | Rosso Ammonitico Veronese Formation | Italy | A pliosaurid. The type species is Anguanax zignoi. | |
| Atychodracon | Gen. et comb. nov | Valid | Smith | Early Jurassic | | United Kingdom | A rhomaleosaurid plesiosaur; a new genus for "Plesiosaurus" megacephalus Stutchbury (1846). | |
| Cardiocorax | Gen. et sp. nov | Valid | Araújo et al. | Late Cretaceous (early Maastrichtian) | Mocuio Formation | Angola | An elasmosaurid plesiosaur. The type species is Cardiocorax mukulu. | |
| Dianmeisaurus | Gen. et sp. nov | Valid | Shang & Li | Middle Triassic (Anisian) | Guangling Formation | China | A member of Eosauropterygia of uncertain phylogenetic placement, more closely related to nothosaurs than to plesiosaurs. The type species is Dianmeisaurus gracilis. | |
| Makhaira | Gen. et sp. nov | Valid | Fischer et al. | Early Cretaceous (Hauterivian) | | Russia | A pliosaurid. The type species is Makhaira rossica. | |
| Vegasaurus | Gen. et sp. nov | Valid | O'Gorman et al. | Late Cretaceous (early Maastrichtian) | Snow Hill Island Formation | Antarctica (Vega Island) | An elasmosaurid plesiosaur. The type species is Vegasaurus molyi. | |
| Wangosaurus | Gen. et sp. nov | Valid | Ma et al. | Middle Triassic (Ladinian) | Falang Formation | China | A pistosauroid. The type species is Wangosaurus brevirostris. | |

== Lepidosaurs ==
=== Research ===
- A phylogenetic analysis of living and fossil squamate relationships, based on morphological and molecular data, is published by Reeder et al. (2015).
- Miocene anoles from the Dominican amber, showing the habitat specializations also present in the extant Caribbean anoles, are described by Sherratt et al. (2015).

=== New taxa ===
==== Rhynchocephalians ====
| Name | Novelty | Status | Authors | Age | Unit | Location | Notes | Images |
|---|---|---|---|---|---|---|---|---|
| Clevosaurus sectumsemper | Sp. nov | Valid | Klein et al. | Late Triassic (Rhaetian) | | United Kingdom | A clevosaurid sphenodontian, a species of Clevosaurus. | |

==== Lizards ====
| Name | Novelty | Status | Authors | Age | Unit | Location | Notes | Images |
|---|---|---|---|---|---|---|---|---|
| Archaerhineura | Gen. et sp. nov | Valid | Longrich et al. | Late Palaeocene | Polecat Bench Formation | United States | A rhineurid amphisbaenian. The type species is Archaerhineura mephitis. | |
| Asagaolacerta | Gen. et sp. nov | Valid | Evans & Matsumoto | Early Cretaceous | Kuwajima Formation | Japan | A lizard of uncertain phylogenetic placement. The type species is Asagaolacerta tricuspidens. | |
| Asprosaurus | Gen. et sp. nov | Valid | Park, Evans & Huh | Late Cretaceous | | South Korea | A member of Anguimorpha, probably a member of Monstersauria. The type species is Asprosaurus bibongriensis. | |
| Babibasiliscus | Gen. et sp. nov | Valid | Conrad | Eocene (approximately 48 Ma) | Bridger Formation | United States | A member of Corytophanidae. The type species is Babibasiliscus alxi. | |
| Barbatteius | Gen. et sp. nov. | Valid | Venczel & Codrea | Late Cretaceous (early Maastrichtian) | Haţeg Basin | Romania | Originally assigned to the family Teiidae, but subsequently transferred to the separate family Barbatteiidae within the group Teiioidea. The type species is Barbatteius vremiri. | |
| Cadurcogekko verus | Sp. nov | Valid | Bolet et al. | Eocene | | France | A gekkotan lizard, a species of Cadurcogekko. | |
| Chromatogenys | Gen. et sp. nov | Valid | Makádi & Nydam | Late Cretaceous (Santonian) | | Hungary | A member of Scincomorpha of uncertain phylogenetic placement. The type species is Chromatogenys tiliquoides. | |
| Chthonophis | Gen. et sp. nov | Valid | Longrich et al. | Probably early Palaeocene | Bug Creek Anthills, Fort Union Formation | United States | An amphisbaenian, the only member of the new family Chthonophidae. The type species is Chthonophis subterraneus. | |
| Cuvieribaena | Gen. et sp. nov | Valid | Čerňanský, Augéc & Rage | Eocene (Bartonian) | | France | A blanid amphisbaenian. The type species is Cuvieribaena carlgansi. | |
| Dryadissector | Gen. et sp. nov | Valid | Wick, Lehman & Brink | Late Cretaceous (early Campanian) | Aguja Formation | United States | A member of Varanoidea. The type species is Dryadissector shilleri. | |
| Gekkomimus | Gen. et comb. nov | Valid | Bolet et al. | Eocene | | France | A skink; a new genus for "Cadurcogekko" rugosus Augé (2005). | |
| Gueragama | Gen. et sp. nov | Valid | Simões et al. | Late Cretaceous (Turonian-Campanian) | Goio-Erê Formation | Brazil | The first member of Acrodonta (a relative of agamids and chameleons) described from South America. The type species is Gueragama sulamericana. | |
| Hakuseps | Gen. et sp. nov | Valid | Evans & Matsumoto | Early Cretaceous | | Japan | A squamate of uncertain phylogenetic placement. The type species is Hakuseps imberis. | |
| Kuroyuriella | Gen. et sp. nov | Valid | Evans & Matsumoto | Early Cretaceous | Kuwajima Formation | Japan | A lizard of uncertain phylogenetic placement. The type species is Kuroyuriella mikikoi. | |
| Norellius | Gen. et sp. nov | Valid | Conrad & Daza | Early Cretaceous (probably approximately 130 Mya) | Öösh Basin | Mongolia | A member of Gekkonomorpha of uncertain phylogenetic placement. The type species is Norellius nyctisaurops. | |
| Ophisaurus holeci | Sp. nov | Valid | Klembara | Miocene | | Czech Republic; Germany | A glass lizard. | |
| Pachygenys adachii | Sp. nov | Valid | Ikeda, Ota & Saegusa | Early Cretaceous | Ohyamashimo Formation | Japan | A squamate of uncertain phylogenetic placement, a species of Pachygenys. | |
| Phosphorosaurus ponpetelegans | Sp. nov | Valid | Konishi et al. | Late Cretaceous (Maastrichtian) | | Japan | A halisaurine mosasaur, a species of Phosphorosaurus. | |
| Plioplatecarpus peckensis | Sp. nov | Valid | Cuthbertson & Holmes | Late Cretaceous (Campanian) | Bearpaw Formation | United States | A mosasaur, a species of Plioplatecarpus. | |
| Pseudopus rugosus | Sp. nov | Valid | Klembara | Early Miocene | | Czech Republic | A relative of the sheltopusik. | |
| Tetrapodophis | Gen. et sp. nov | Valid | Martill, Tischlinger & Longrich | Early Cretaceous (Aptian) | Crato Formation | Brazil | A squamate reptile of uncertain phylogenetic placement; originally classified as an early, four-legged snake, but subsequently argued to be a dolichosaurid. The type species is Tetrapodophis amplectus. | |

==== Snakes ====
| Name | Novelty | Status | Authors | Age | Unit | Location | Notes | Images |
|---|---|---|---|---|---|---|---|---|
| Diablophis | Gen. et comb. nov | Valid | Caldwell et al. | Late Jurassic | Morrison Formation | United States | A basal snake; a new genus for "Parviraptor" gilmorei Evans (1996). | |
| Eophis | Gen. et sp. nov | Valid | Caldwell et al. | Middle Jurassic (Bathonian) | Forest Marble | United Kingdom | A basal snake. The type species is Eophis underwoodi. | |
| Portugalophis | Gen. et sp. nov | Valid | Caldwell et al. | Late Jurassic (Kimmeridgian) | Camadas de Guimarota | Portugal | A basal snake. The type species is Portugalophis lignites. | |
| Renenutet | Gen. et sp. nov | Valid | Mccartney & Seiffert | Eocene (Priabonian) | | Egypt | A member of Colubroidea. The type species is Renenutet enmerwer. | |

== Turtles ==
| Name | Novelty | Status | Authors | Age | Unit | Location | Notes | Images |
|---|---|---|---|---|---|---|---|---|
| Adocus sengokuensis | Sp. nov | Valid | Sonoda et al. | Early Cretaceous | Sengoku Formation | Japan | A species of Adocus. | |
| Arvinachelys | Gen. et sp. nov | Valid | Lively | Late Cretaceous (Campanian) | Kaiparowits Formation | United States | A member of Baenidae. The type species is Arvinachelys goldeni. | |
| Bairdemys thalassica | Sp. nov | Valid | Ferreira et al. | Miocene | Capadare Formation | Venezuela | A podocnemidid belonging to the clade Stereogenyina, a species of Bairdemys. | |
| Baltemys velogastros | Sp. nov | Valid | Lichtig & Lucas | Eocene (early Bridgerian) | Huerfano Formation | United States | A member of Kinosternidae, a species of Baltemys. | |
| Corsochelys bentleyi | Sp. nov | Valid | Schwimmer et al. | Late Cretaceous | | United States | A member of Dermochelyidae, a species of Corsochelys. | |
| Desmatochelys padillai | Sp. nov | Valid | Cadena & Parham | Early Cretaceous (late Barremian-early Aptian) | Paja Formation | Colombia | A member of Protostegidae, species of Desmatochelys. | Desmatochelys padillai |
| Gaffneylania | Gen. et sp. nov | Valid | Sterli, de la Fuente & Krause | Middle Eocene | Sarmiento Formation | Argentina | A member of Meiolaniidae. The type species is Gaffneylania auricularis. | |
| Gobiapalone palaeocenica | Sp. nov | Valid | Danilov et al. | Paleocene | Bugin Tsav Basin | Mongolia | A member of Trionychidae, a species of Gobiapalone. The genus Gobiapalone was considered to be a junior synonym of the genus Kuhnemys by Georgalis & Joyce (2017), though the authors maintained G. palaeocenica as a distinct species within the latter genus. | |
| Gomphochelys | Gen. et sp. nov | Valid | Bourque et al. | Early Wasatchian | Willwood Formation | United States | A member of Dermatemydidae. The type species is Gomphochelys nanus. | |
| Judithemys russelli | Sp. nov | Valid | Brinkman | Late Cretaceous | | Canada | A member of (likely non-monophyletic) Macrobaenidae, a species of Judithemys. | |
| Jurassichelon | Gen. et sp. nov | Valid | Pérez-García | Late Jurassic (early Tithonian) | | France | A basal member of Eucryptodira. The type species is Jurassichelon oleronensis. | |
| Khunnuchelys lophorhothon | Sp. nov | Valid | Danilov et al. | Late Cretaceous (Santonian or early Campanian) | Bostobe Formation | Kazakhstan | A trionychine trionychid, a species of Khunnuchelys. | |
| Kimurachelys | Gen. et sp. nov | Valid | Brinkman et al. | Late Cretaceous (late Campanian) | Dinosaur Park Formation | Canada | A chelonioid turtle. The type species is Kimurachelys slobodae. | |
| Leyvachelys | Gen. et sp. nov | Valid | Cadena | Early Cretaceous (Barremian-Aptian) | Glen Rose Formation; Paja Formation | Colombia; United States | A member of Pan-Cryptodira belonging to the family Sandownidae. The type species is Leyvachelys cipadi. | |
| Mauremys oshiroi | Sp. nov. | Valid | Takahashi et al. | Late Pleistocene | Tomori Amaga Cave | Japan | A pond turtle. | |
| Neurankylus hutchisoni | Sp. nov | Valid | Lively | Late Cretaceous (Campanian) | Kaiparowits Formation | United States | A member of Baenidae, a species of Neurankylus. | |
| Neurankylus utahensis | Sp. nov | Valid | Lively | Late Cretaceous (Campanian) | Kaiparowits Formation | United States | A member of Baenidae, a species of Neurankylus. | |
| Perochelys | Gen. et sp. nov. | Valid | Li, Joyce & Liu | Early Cretaceous (Aptian) | Jiufotang Formation | China | A soft-shelled turtle of uncertain phylogenetic placement; it might be a stem- or a crown-trionychid. The type species is Perochelys lamadongensis. | |
| Phunoichelys | Gen. et sp. nov. | Valid | Tong et al. | Late Jurassic | Phu Kradung Formation | Thailand | A xinjiangchelyid eucryptodiran. The type species is Phunoichelys thirakhupti. | |
| Portlandemys gracilis | Sp. nov. | Valid | Anquetin, Püntener & Billon-Bruyat | Late Jurassic (late Kimmeridgian) | Reuchenette Formation | Switzerland | A plesiochelyid eucryptodiran, a species of Portlandemys. | |
| Sternotherus bonevalleyensis | Sp. nov. | Valid | Bourque & Schubert | Late Hemphillian | | United States | A musk turtle. | |
| Sternotherus palaeodorus | Sp. nov. | Valid | Bourque & Schubert | Late Hemphillian | | United States | A musk turtle. | |
| Taraschelon | Gen. et comb. nov | Valid | Pérez-García | Early Oligocene | | France | A tortoise; a new genus for "Testudo" gigas Bravard (1844). | |
| Testudo brevitesta | Sp. nov | Valid | Vlachos & Tsoukala | Late Pliocene (early Villafranchian) | | Greece | A tortoise, a species of Testudo. | |
| Thalassemys bruntrutana | Sp. nov | Valid | Püntener, Anquetin & Billon-Bruyat | Late Jurassic (late Kimmeridgian) | Reuchenette Formation | Switzerland | A basal member of Pancryptodira, a species of Thalassemys. | |
| Toremys | Gen. et sp. nov. | Valid | Pérez-García et al. | Early Cretaceous (early Albian) | | Spain | A pleurosternid paracryptodiran. The type species is Toremys cassiopeia. | |
| "Trionyx" jixiensis | Sp. nov. | Valid | Li et al. | Early Cretaceous | Chengzihe Formation | China | A member of Trionychinae of uncertain phylogenetic placement. | |
| Xiaochelys | Gen. et sp. nov | Valid | Zhou & Rabi | Early Cretaceous (Barremian-early Aptian) | Yixian Formation | China | A member of Sinemydidae. The type species is Xiaochelys ningchengensis. | |

== Archosauriformes ==
=== Other ===
- A study on the archosauriform evolutionary history during the Late Permian and Early Triassic, including description of chirotheriid and chirotheriid-like tracks from the Late Permian of Northern Italy, is published by Bernardi et al. (2015).

== Other reptiles ==
| Name | Novelty | Status | Authors | Age | Unit | Location | Notes | Images |
|---|---|---|---|---|---|---|---|---|
| Eohyosaurus | Gen. et sp. nov | Disputed | Butler et al. | Middle Triassic (early Anisian) | Burgersdorp Formation | South Africa | A basal rhynchosaur. The type species is Eohyosaurus wolvaardti. Considered to be a junior synonym of Howesia browni by Spiekman et al. (2026). | |
| Erpetonyx | Gen. et sp. nov | Valid | Modesto et al. | Carboniferous (Gzhelian) | Egmont Bay Formation | Canada | A relative of bolosaurids. The type species is Erpetonyx arsenaultorum. | |
| Glaurung | Gen. et sp. nov | Valid | Bulanov & Sennikov | Late Permian | | Germany | A member of Weigeltisauridae. The type species is Glaurung schneideri. | |
| Opisthodontosaurus | Gen. et sp. nov | Valid | Reisz et al. | Early Permian | Garber Formation | United States | A member of Captorhinidae. The type species is Opisthodontosaurus carrolli. | |
| Pappochelys | Gen. et sp. nov | Valid | Schoch & Sues | Middle Triassic (Ladinian) | Erfurt Formation | Germany | A stem-turtle. The type species is Pappochelys rosinae. | Pappochelys |
| "Thalassodromeus" sebesensis | Sp. nov | Valid | Grellet-Tinner & Codrea | Late Cretaceous (Maastrichtian) | | Romania | A reptile of uncertain phylogenetic placement; initially classified as a pterosaur and a species of Thalassodromeus, but subsequently argued to be a turtle and a junior synonym of Kallokibotion bajazidi. | |
