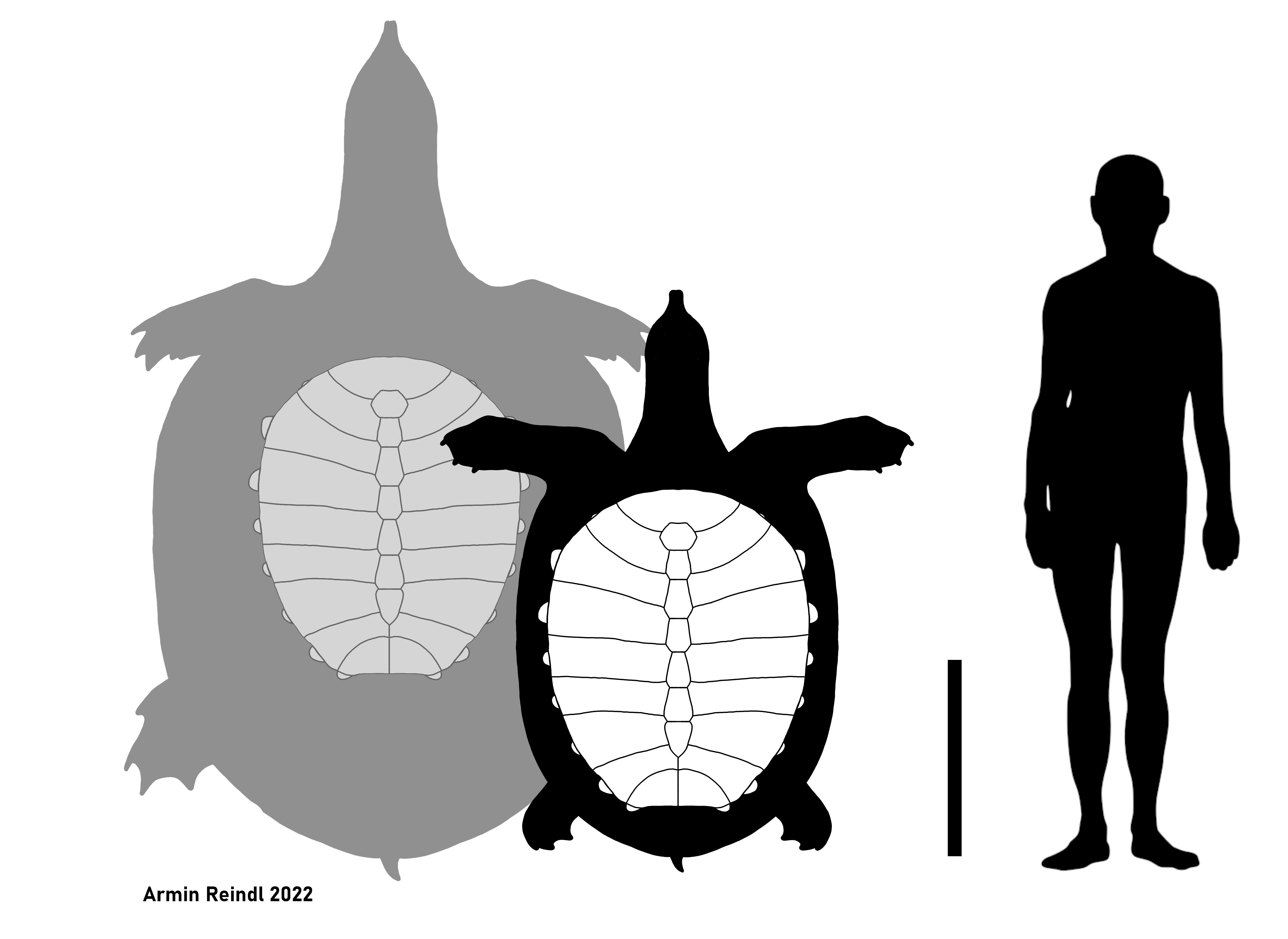
- Upper and lower estimates of Drazinderetes tethyensis

Scientific classification
- Kingdom: Animalia
- Phylum: Chordata
- Class: Reptilia
- Order: Testudines
- Suborder: Cryptodira
- Family: Trionychidae
- Subfamily: Trionychinae
- Genus: †Drazinderetes; Head et al., 1999

Type species
- Drazinderetes tethyensis Head et al., 1999

= Drazinderetes =

Drazinderetes Temporal range: Bartonian

Extinct genus of turtles

Drazinderetes is a large bodied genus of soft shell turtle from the Middle Eocene Drazinda Formation of Pakistan. Its presence in the shallow marine deposits of the Drazinda Formation suggests that Drazinderetes may have been a partially or fully marine animal. Indetermined trionychine remains from the same formation may suggest that Drazinderetes could have been among the largest known turtles, with one entoplastron indicating a potential length of 1.5 to 2.1 meters (4 ft 11 in to 6 ft 11 in). Drazinderetes currently consists of only a single species: Drazinderetes tethyensis.

== Discovery and naming ==
The first surveys of the Drazinda Formation were conducted in 1993 and 1996 by the Geological Survey of Pakistan and the University of Michigan. The holotype (GSP-UM 3 195) of Drazinderetes, a nearly complete carapace, was found during the 1996 exploration of the area west of Satta Post in sediments of Bartonian age (39 - 38 Ma) that also yielded archaeocetes, including Basiloterus, and primitive sea cows.

Several other remains assigned to softshell turtles have been found from the same sediments, however they largely don't overlap with the type specimen and can thus not be directly referred to it. This includes GSP-UM 3019, an exceptionally large entoplastron, and GSP-UM 3 185, a small hypoplastron possibly belonging to a juvenile specimen. GSP-UM 3 185, a carapace fragment, is the only specimen to overlap with the holotype. It is slightly larger and heavily weathered, with smooth edges that do not match what is observed in the type specimen. Given the insufficient material, these specimen could only be designated as Trionychidae indet. and like the holotype, all these specimen have been collected in 1996.

The name derives from the Drazinda Formation and "eretes", Greek for rower (mirroring the name of Aspideretes). The species name derives from the Tethys Sea, which the animal likely inhabited.

== Description ==
The shell of Drazinderetes shows a fully preserved nuchal plate followed by 8 pairs of costal plates. It's roughly oval in shape when viewed from above, with the right half notably better preserved in the holotype specimen. The shell expands sideways through the second costal and reaches its greatest width of 700 millimetres (27.6 in) from the third to fifth costal plates. After the fifth costal the carapace tapers until the final plate of the shell. The back end of the shell shows a distinct concave margin. On top of the shell, between the nuchal and first costal plate sits a hexagonal, raised bony plate that corresponds in position and in its connection to the first thoracic vertebra to the preneural plate in other softshell turtles. The following neural plates however are largely obscured due to the poor preservation of the carapace's midline. The entire carapace is notably sculpted with a surface covered by tightly intertwined patterns that are in turn overlain by concentric rings that become more irregular towards the center of the shell. The inside of the shell shows a single pair of costiform processes that are fused to the nuchal plate. The processes do not protrude beyond the shell's edge and overlap with the first pair of thoracic ribs. The ribs themselves possess thin heads and do not extend very far from the edge of the costal plates unlike in some other softshell turtles. They are generally rectangular or convex in outline.

=== Size ===
Unlike in many other testudines, the shell of trionychid turtles is composed only partly of the bony carapace, with cartilage making up 20% (Apalone) to 45% (Malayan softshell turtle) of the entire carapace length depending on the species. Since the exact relationship between Drazinderetes (and GSP-UM 3019) and other softshell turtles are largely unknown, Head and colleagues instead opted to calculate both the minimum and maximum extend of cartilage as seen in modern taxa. The holotype specimen preserves a bony carapace that measures 0.8 m (2.6 ft) mm in length. In accordance with modern species, the cartilage may add up to a total carapace length between 1 m (3.3 ft) and 1.455 m (4.77 ft).

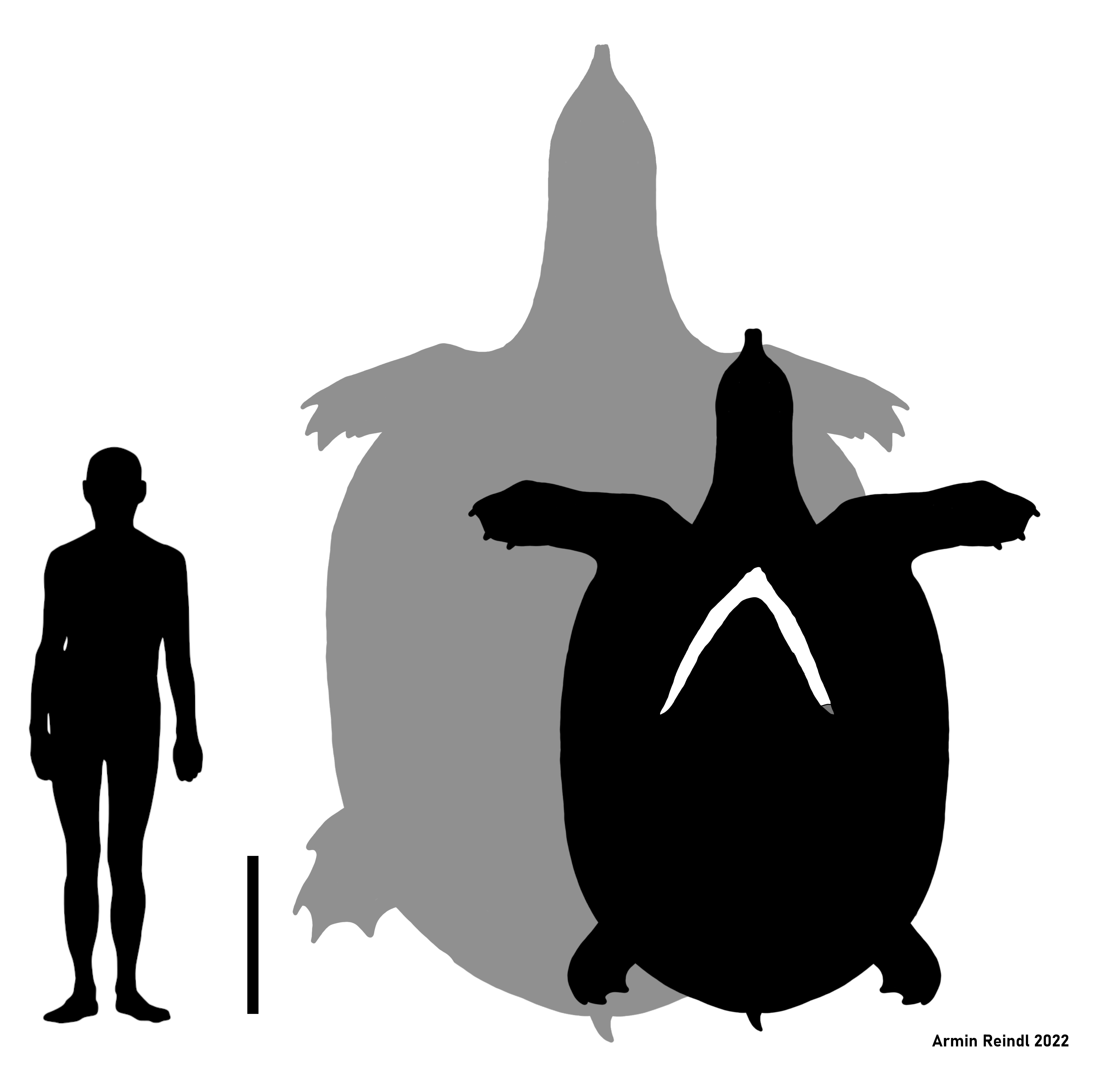
Upper and lower estimates of a large, undetermined trionychid from the Drazinda Formation

For GSP-UM 3019, an exceptionally large specimen that may belong to the same species, a total carapace length of 1.2 meters was extrapolated based on the known plastron remains. Following the same method applied to the Drazinderetes holotype, this would yield a total length between 1.5 m (4.9 ft) to 2.182 m (7.16 ft) meters. This not only places GSP-UM 3019 as the largest recorded trionychid, outsizing Axestemys, an Eocene softshell turtle from the Bridger Formation of Wyoming (bony carapace length of 0.97 m (3.2 ft)), but as one of the largest known turtles. Even the lower estimates rival modern leatherback sea turtles, while upper estimates are comparable to large protostegids such as Archelon. Merely the Miocene podocnemidid Stupendemys is larger. Ignoring this specimen, Drazinderetes is still notably larger than any extant softshell turtle.

== Phylogeny ==
Upon its description, Drazinderetes was assigned to the Trionychinae due to the reduced costiform processes typical for the clade as well as characters of the carapace. Analysis conducted by Head et al. showed that Drazinderetes shared characteristics with the Indo-Asian trionychine lineage and place it as a close relative of the dubious genus Aspideretes.

In 2017, Georgalis and Joyce recovered the following phylogentic tree in their research on old world softshell turtles.

- - Perochelys lamadongensis
  - Perochelys kyrgyzensis
  - - Kuhnemys orlovi
    - Kuhnemys maortuensis
    - Kuhnemys breviplastra
    - Kuhnemys palaeocenica
  - - Khunnuchelys kizylkumensis
    - Khunnuchelys lophorhothon
    - Khunnuchelys erinhotensis
  - Pan‑Cyclanorbinae
    - Nemegtemys conflata
    - - Cyclanorbis turkanensis
      - - Cyclanorbis victoriae
        - Cyclanorbis debroinae
  - Axestemys vittata
  - Murgonemys braithwaitei
  - Drazinderetes tethyensis
  - Pan‑Trionychinae
    - Rafetus bohemicus
    - - Trionyx vindobonensis
      - Trionyx pliocenicus
    - Pelodiscus gracilia

== Paleoenvironment ==
Given the lack of evidence that would suggest that the bones of Drazinderetes had been washed into the marine sediments of the Drazinda Formation postmortem, it is deemed likely by Head and colleagues that Drazinderetes was instead a fulltime or at least occasional inhabitant of saltwater environments. Typically freshwater inhabitants wandering into the sea is not unheard of in modern softshell turtles, notably the giant softshell turtle. The unusually large size suggested by some of the specimens may support this fully marine lifestyle, as large body size is often found in marine turtles (although this trait is not exclusive to such a lifestyle). Additionally, if all specimens belong to different ontogenetic stages of a single species, then the presence of younger and fully grown animals in a single environment would furthermore speak in favor of this hypothesis. This would make Drazinderetes the first fully marine softshell turtle.

== See also ==
- Largest prehistoric animals
- List of largest reptiles
