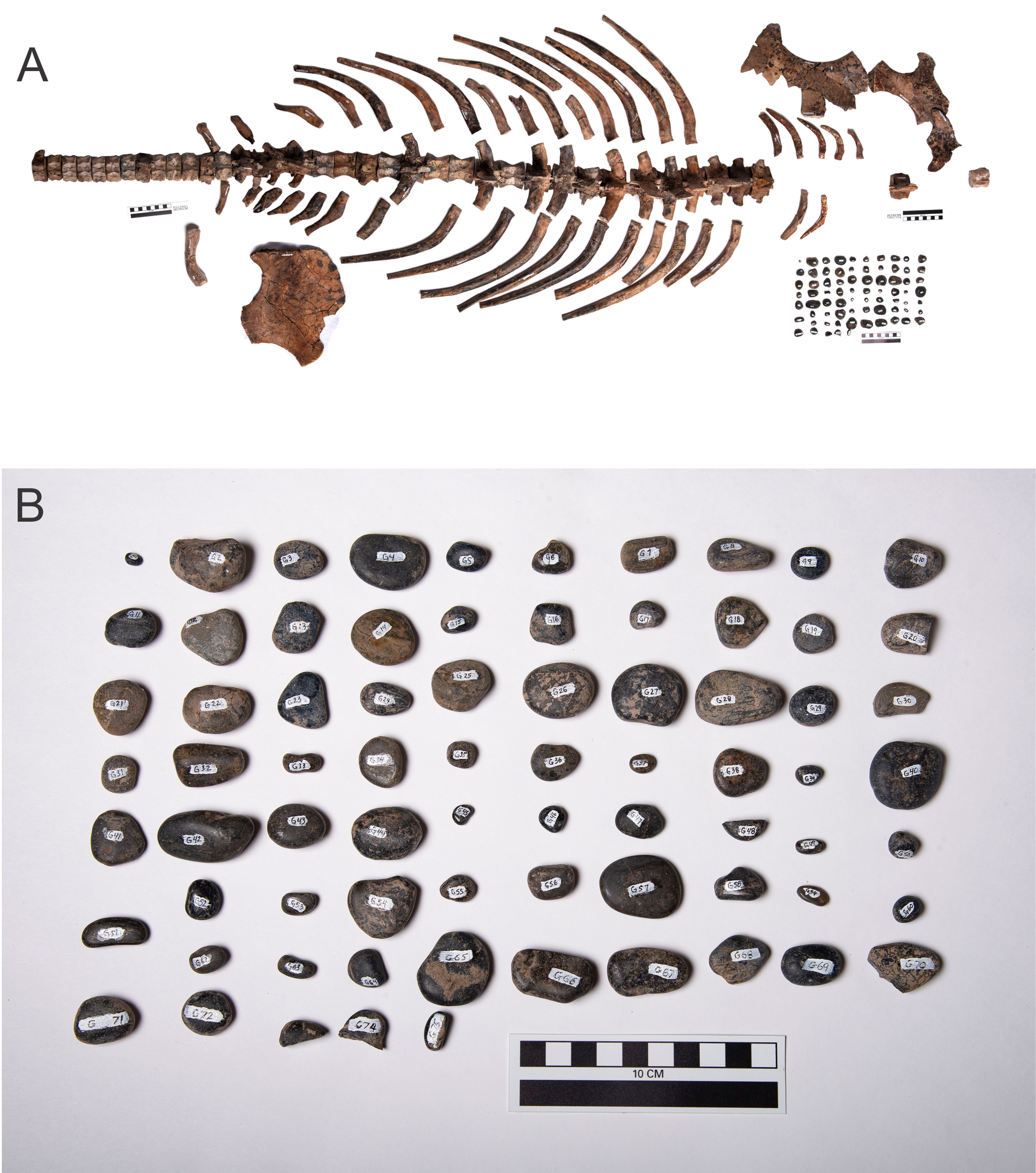
- Holotype with gastroliths

Scientific classification
- Kingdom: Animalia
- Phylum: Chordata
- Class: Reptilia
- Superorder: †Sauropterygia
- Order: †Plesiosauria
- Superfamily: †Plesiosauroidea
- Family: †Elasmosauridae
- Subfamily: †Styxosaurinae
- Genus: †Fluvionectes; Campbell et al., 2021
- Species: †F. sloanae

Binomial name
- †Fluvionectes sloanae Campbell et al., 2021

= Fluvionectes =

Fluvionectes Temporal range: Campanian ~76–75 Ma

Extinct genus of reptiles

Fluvionectes (meaning "river swimmer", from both Latin and Greek) is a genus of elasmosaurid plesiosaur found in the Dinosaur Park Formation in Alberta, Canada.

== Description ==
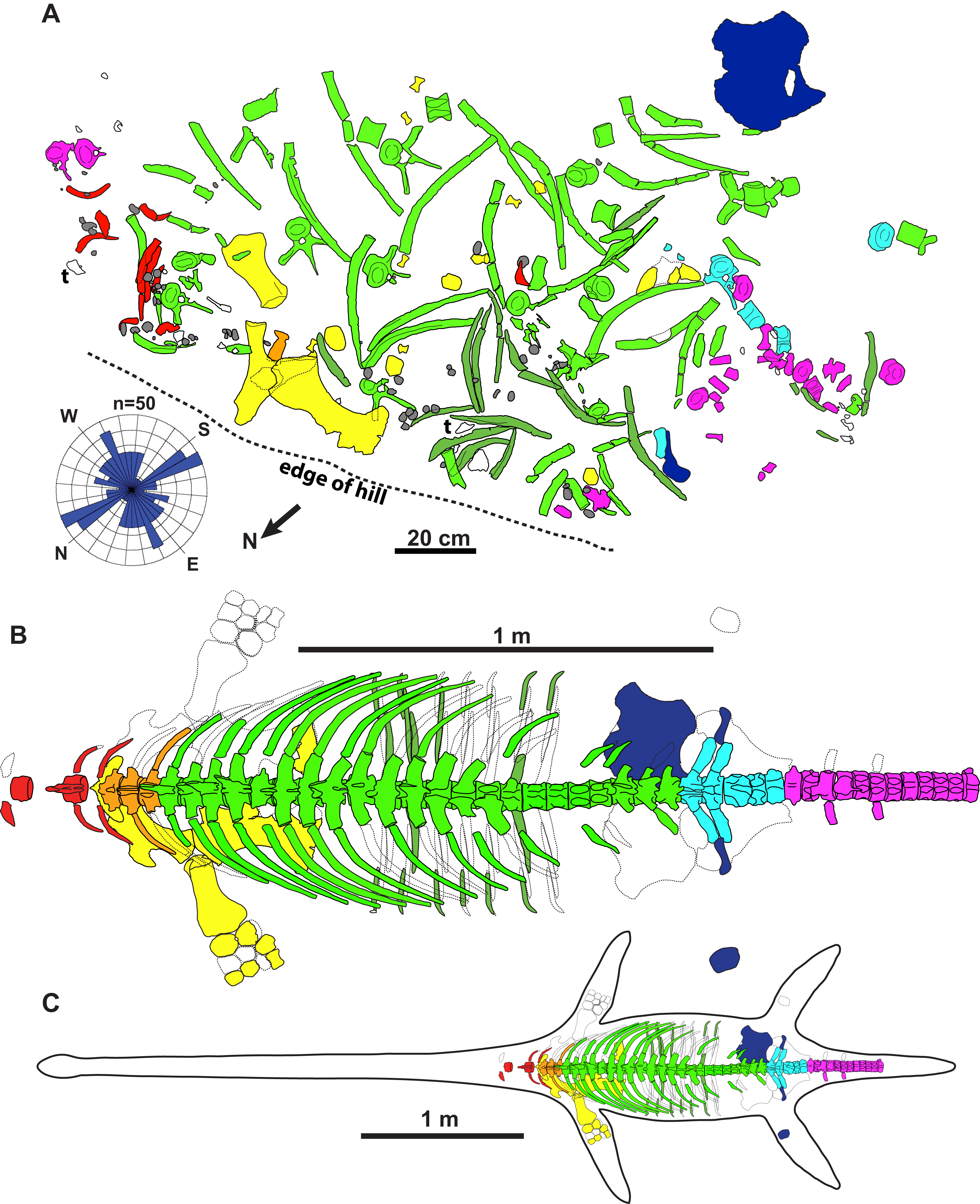
Quarry map (A) and reconstruction of the holotype (B).

The holotype specimen of Fluvionectes is a partial skeleton preserving an osteologically mature, likely a young adult individual that would have reached 5–5.2 m (16–17 ft) long and weighed 392 kilograms (864 lb). A more mature, larger, but more fragmentary specimen (TMP 2009.037.0007) is also known, consisting of a partial rib and gastralium, and left humerus, indicating that this taxon may have reached 7 m (23 ft) in maximum body length. A number of other fragmentary specimens are also known.

The holotype skeleton had 76 gastroliths, largely disc-shaped stones. All were composed of black chert and grey quartzite, the largest of which weighed 15.3 grams.

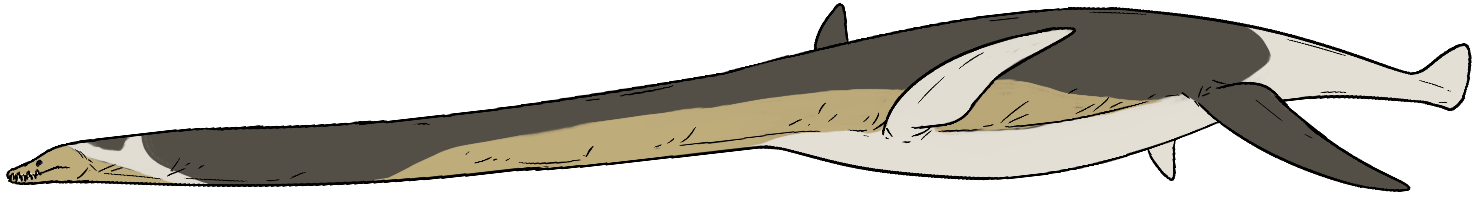
Life restoration

== Classification ==
The describers placed Fluvionectes in Elasmosauridae, in a clade with Albertonectes, Nakonanectes, Styxosaurus, and Terminonatator, which by definition places it in the Elasmosaurinae subfamily.

== Palaeoecology ==
Fluvionectes appears to have been a freshwater and brackish water animal based on its discovery from a non-marine to paralic sedimentary unit. Both the holotype and the largest specimen (TMP 2009.037.0007) were found in brackish estuarine deposits, but a number of other specimens were found in nearby freshwater fluvial deposits. This is significantly different in contrast to most elasmosaurs which were oceanic.

Other fossils associated with the holotype specimen included the turtle Kimurachelys slobodae and the rhinobatoid ray Myledaphus. Three dinoflagellates were also found, suggesting a marine influenced environment, although their low abundance and diversity suggests that it was not an open-marine environment.

The holotype was discovered alongside many pieces of coalified wood, which is interpreted as the carcass having been caught in a log jam.

== Gallery ==
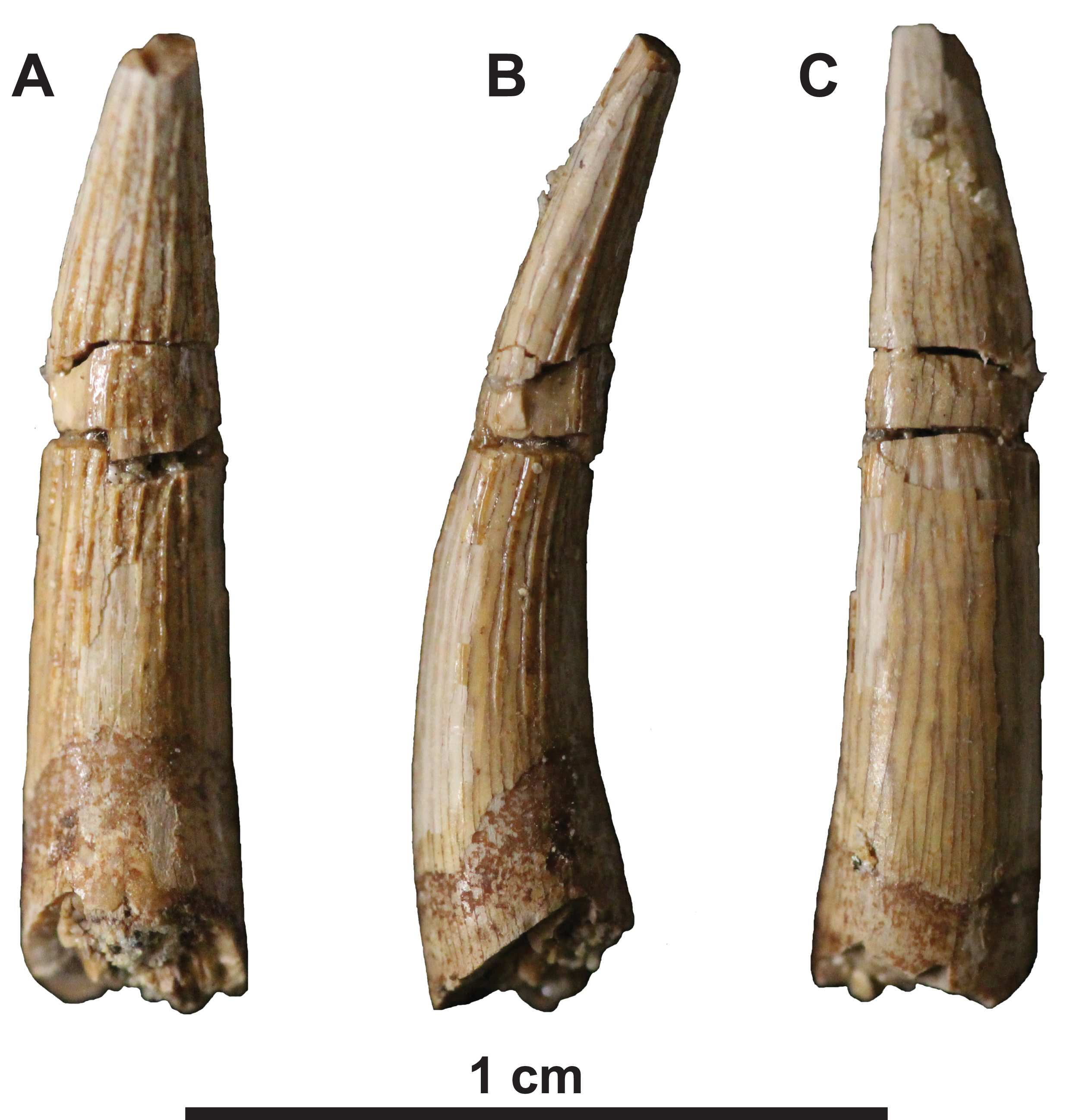
Holotype tooth

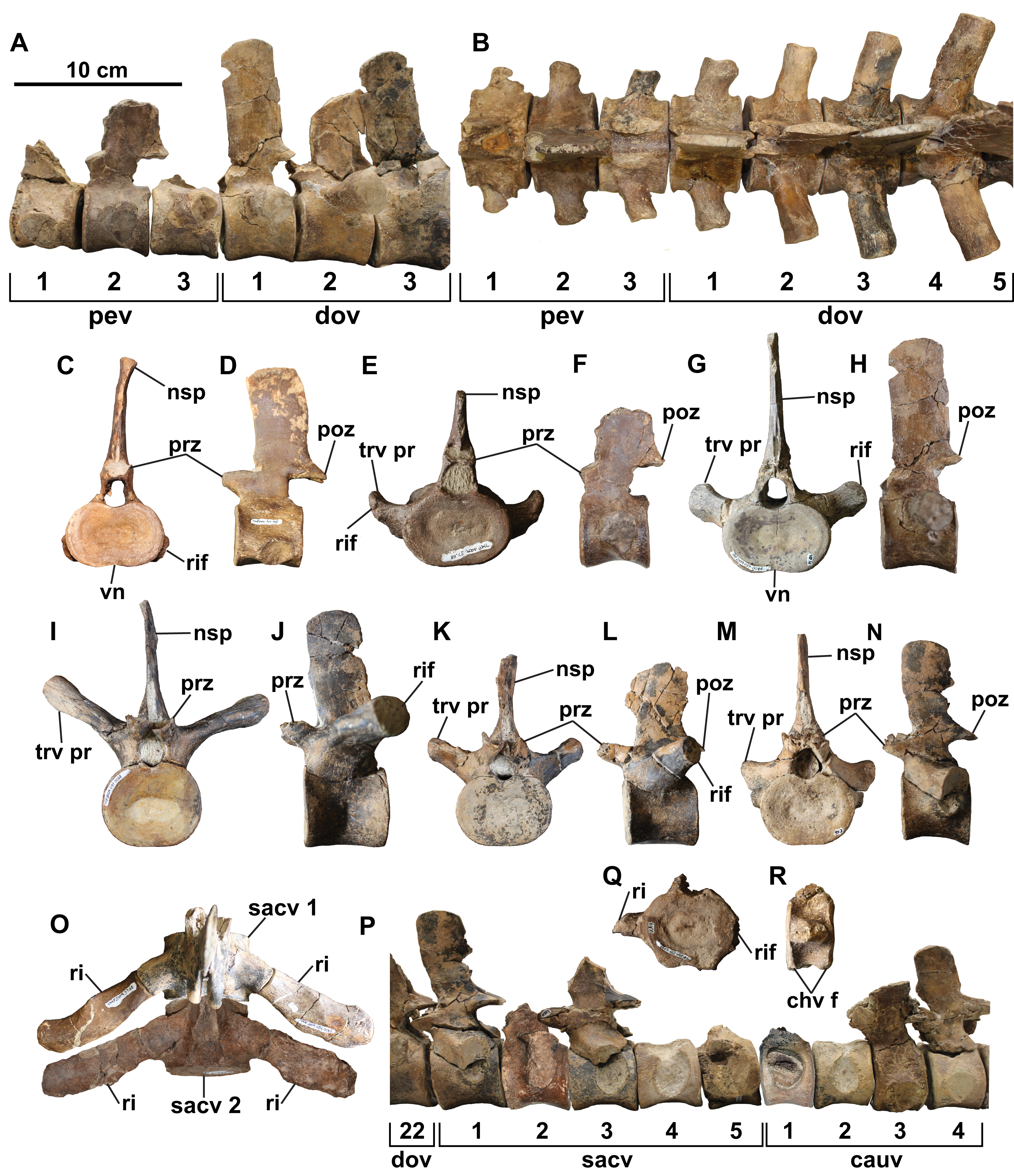
Holotype vertebrae.

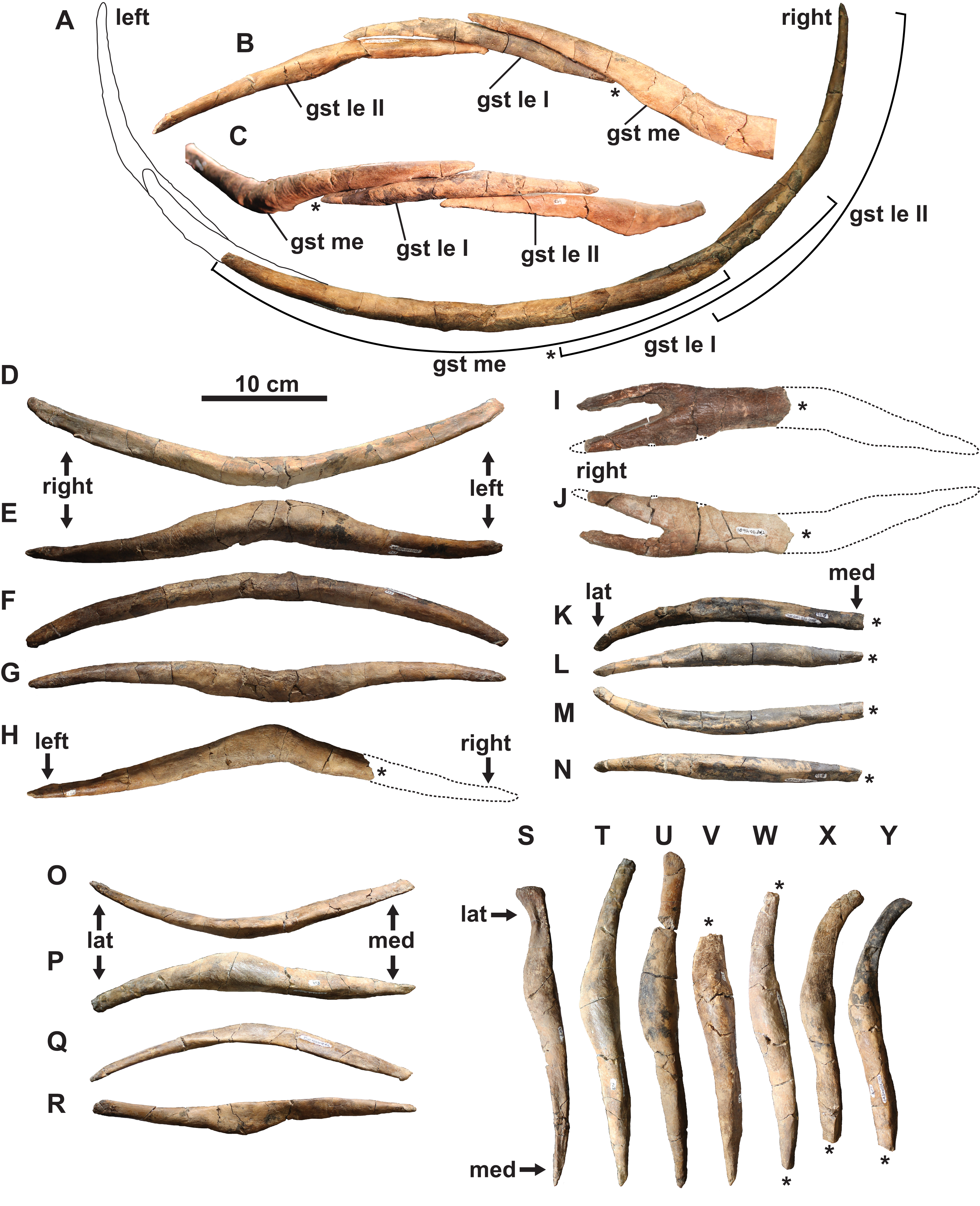
Holotype gastralia

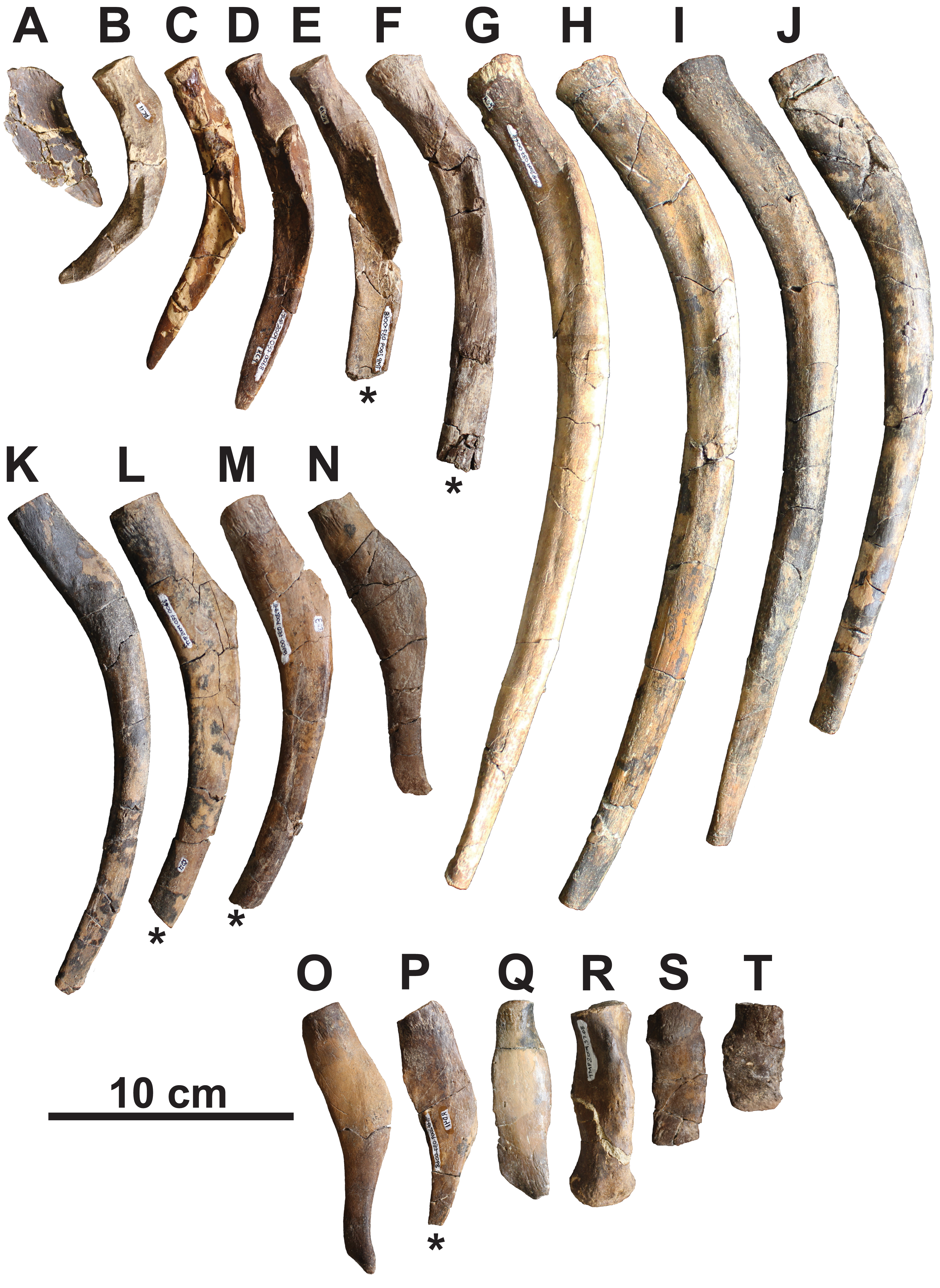
Holotype ribs

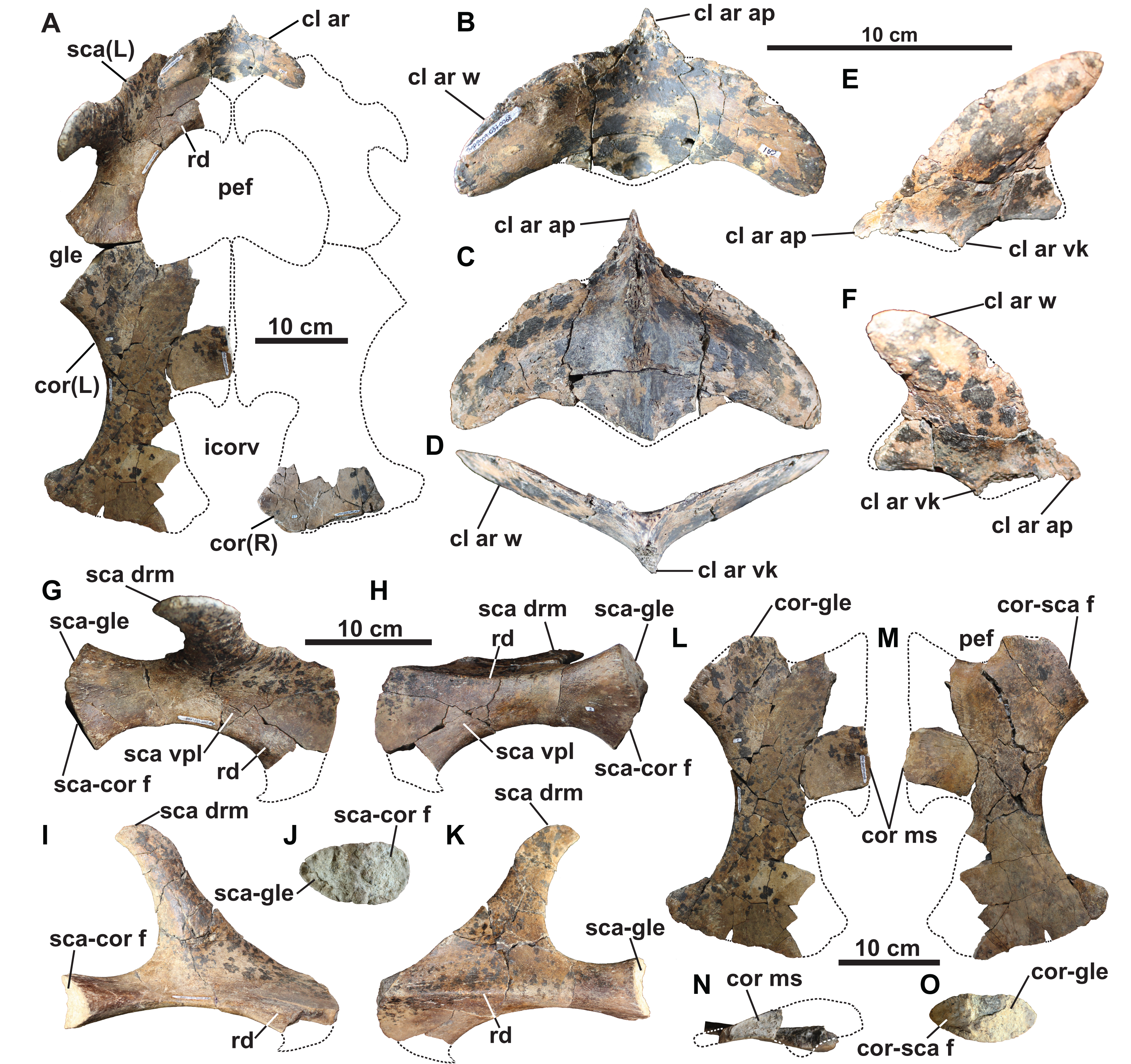
Holotype pectoral girdle

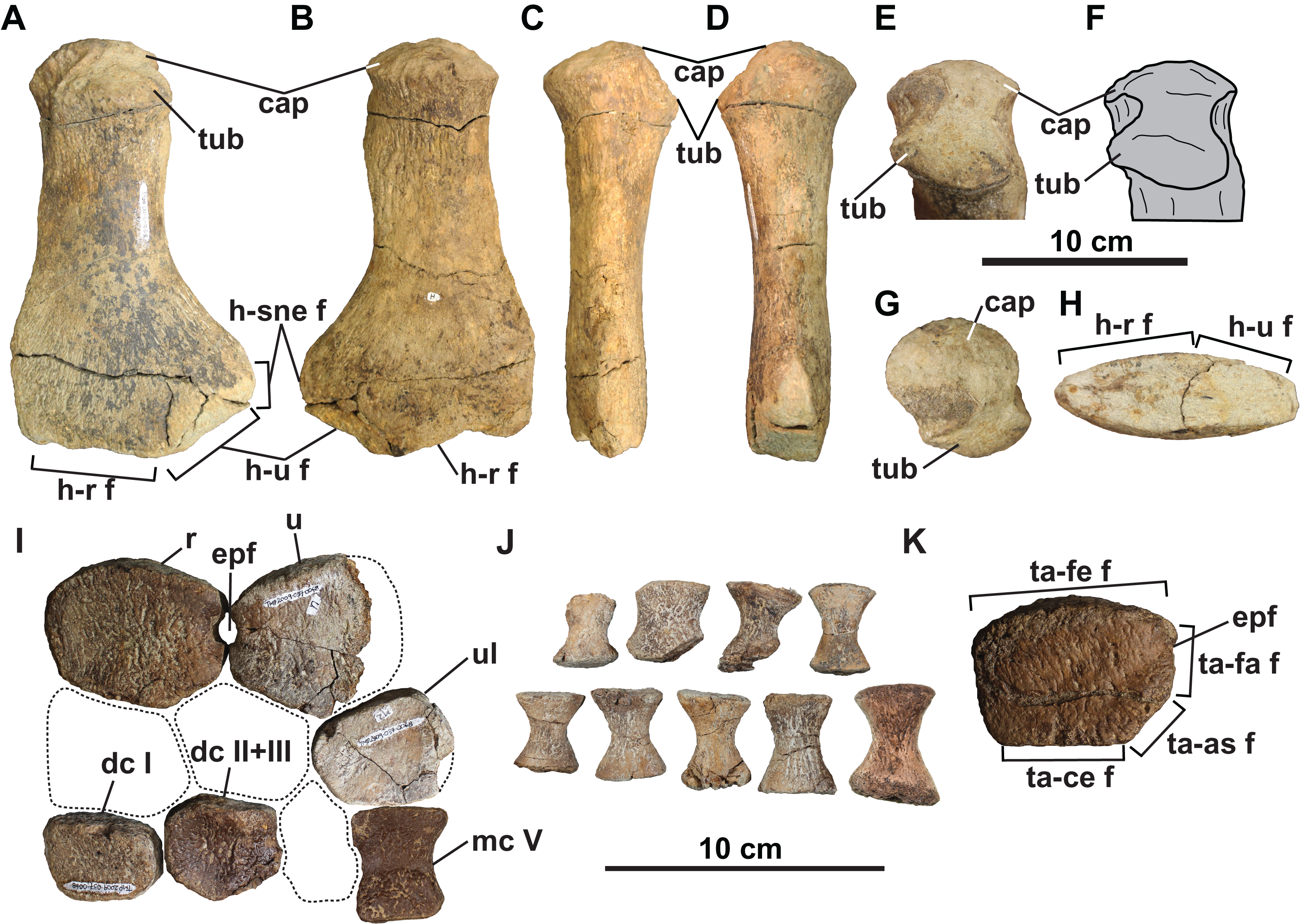
Holotype forelimb (A-J) and hindlimb (K)

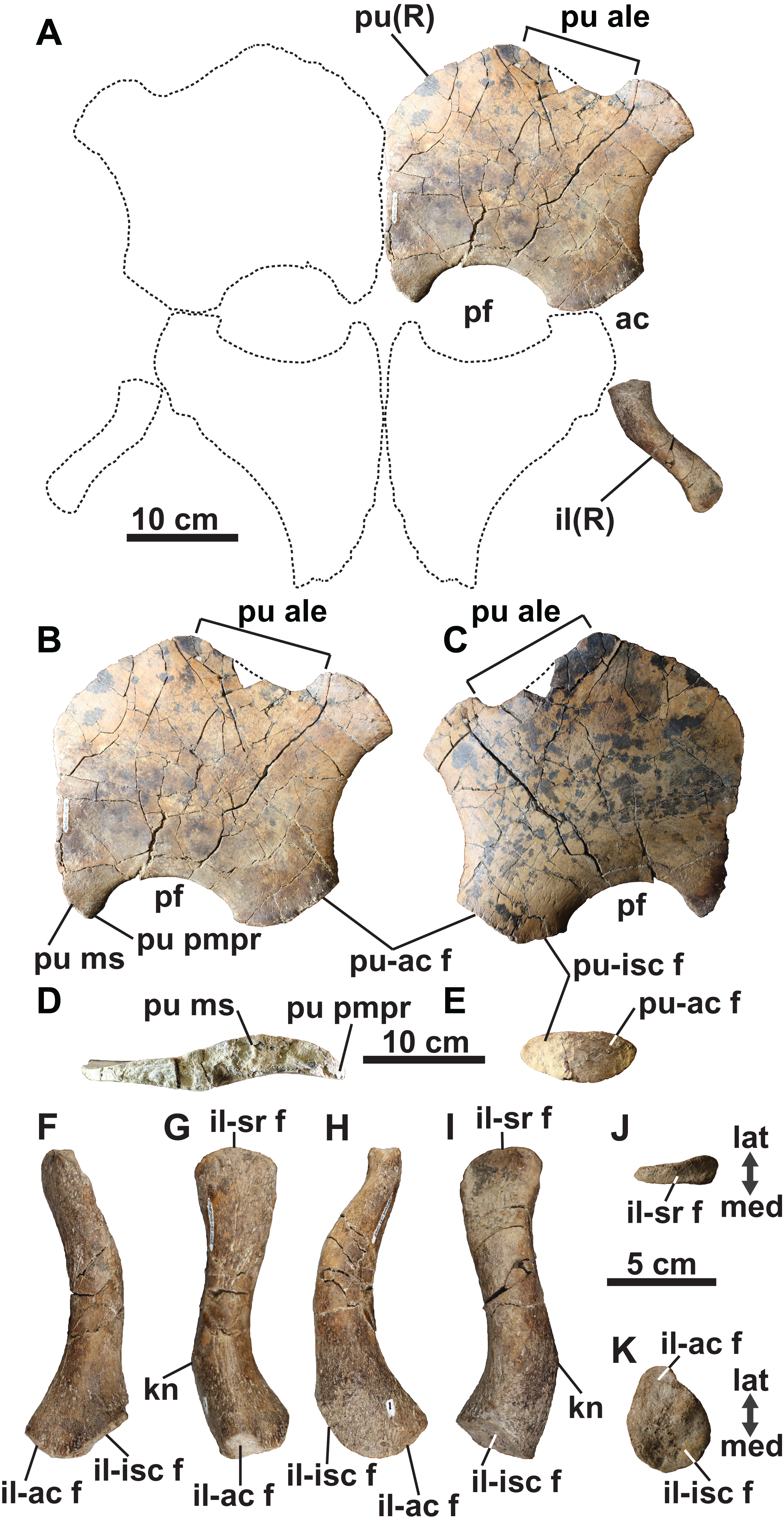
Holotype pelvic girdle

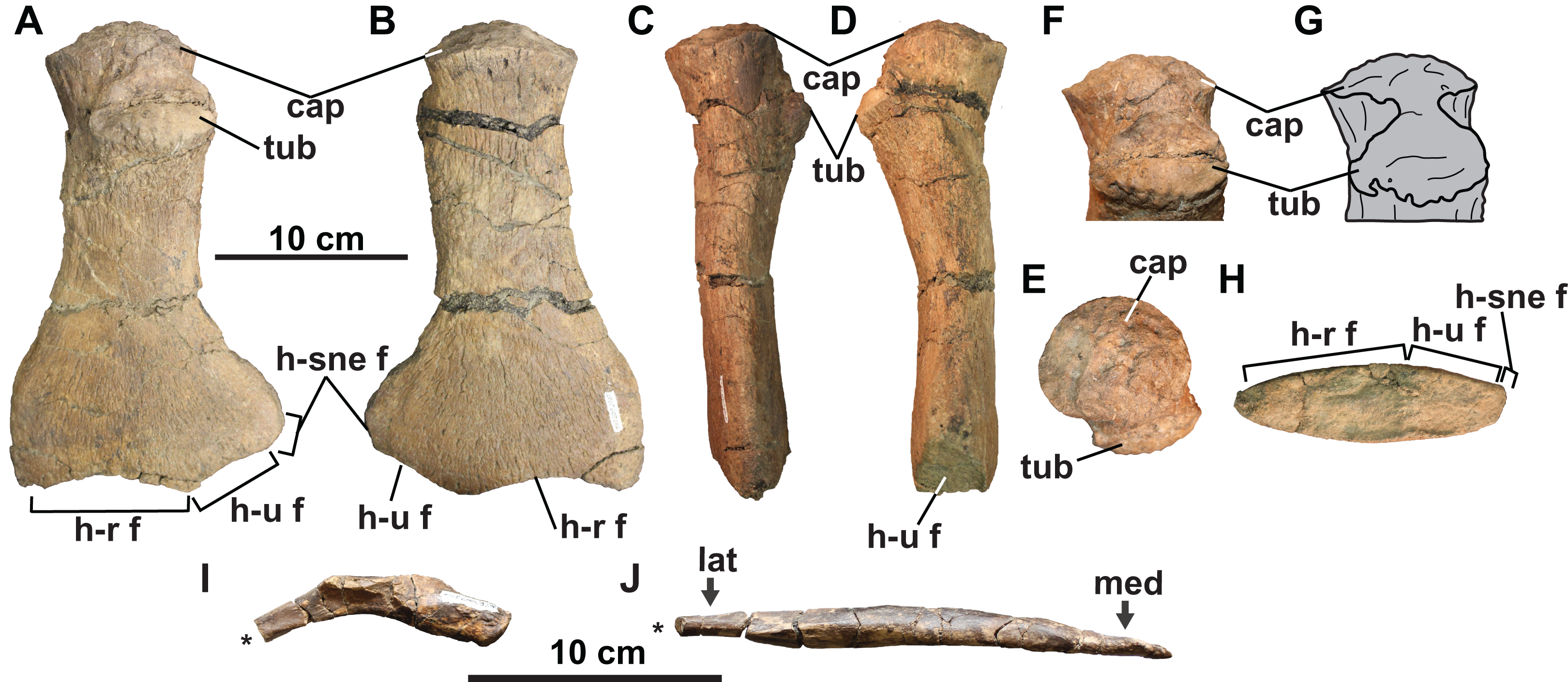
TMP 2009.037.0007

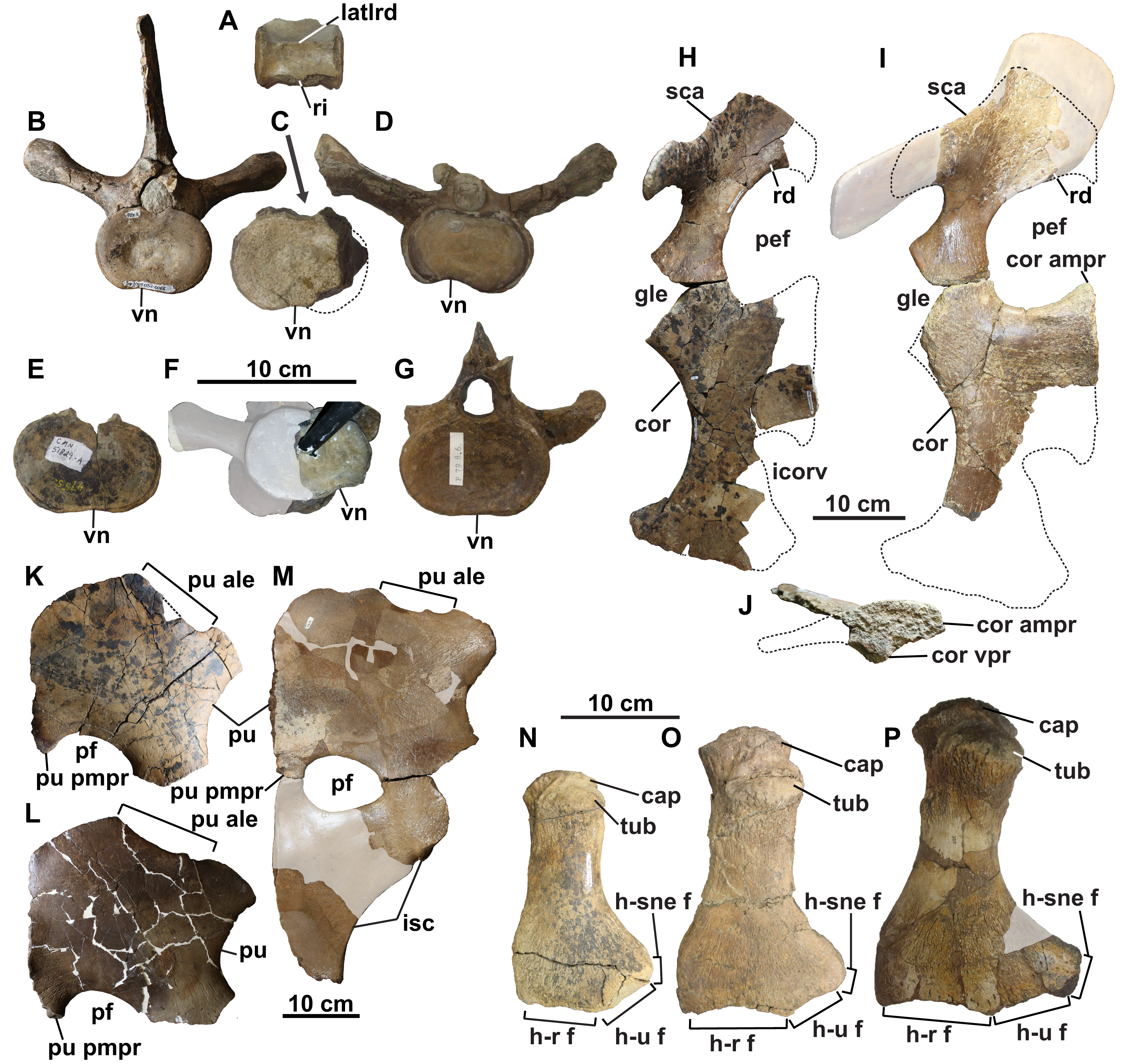
Various specimens: vertebrae, pectoral and pelvic girdles, and humeri
