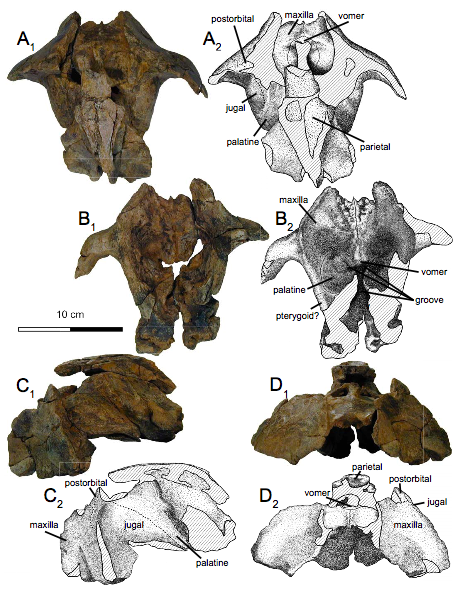
- Holotype skull of K. lophorhothon

Scientific classification
- Kingdom: Animalia
- Phylum: Chordata
- Class: Reptilia
- Order: Testudines
- Suborder: Cryptodira
- Clade: Pan-Trionychidae
- Family: Trionychidae
- Subfamily: Trionychinae
- Genus: †Khunnuchelys; Brinkman et al., 1993

Type species
- †Khunnuchelys erinhotensis Brinkman et al., 1993

Species
- †K. erinhotensis Brinkman et al., 1993; †K. kizylkumensis Brinkman et al., 1993; †K. lophorhothon Danilov et al., 2013

Synonyms
- Synonyms of K. kizylkumensis: Trionyx sp. Nessov, 1986; cf. Eurycephalochelys sp. Chkhikvadze and Shuvalov, 1988; cf. Axestemys riabinini Kordikova, 1994a; Axestemys (Axestemys) sp. Kordikova, 1994b; Synonyms of K. lophorhothon: Trionychidae indet. Kordikova, 1994; cf. Lophorhothon sp. Nessov, 1995; Khunnuchelys sp. Nessov, 1997; Khunnuchelys sp. 1 Danilov and Vitek, 2012; Khunnuchelys sp. 2 Danilov and Vitek, 2012

= Khunnuchelys =

Khunnuchelys Temporal range: Turonian-Campanian, 91–75 Ma

Extinct genus of turtles

Khunnuchelys is an extinct genus of trionychine turtle from the Late Cretaceous of Asia. Three species are known, K. erinhotensis, the type species, K. kizylkumensis, and K. lophorhothon. K. erinhotensis is known from the Iren Dabasu Formation in China from the late Turonian until the middle Campanian. K. kizylkumensis is known from the late Turonian Bissekty Formation of Uzbekistan. The third species, described in 2013 by Danilov et al., is known from the early to middle Campanian aged Bostobe Formation of Kazakhstan.

== History of naming ==
K. lophorothon is known from two skulls, and has a complex history of classifications. Originally, it was assigned to the dinosaur genus cf. Lophorhothon by Lev Alexandrovitch Nessov in 1995 as an unidentified species. Later, it was correctly transferred to the genus Khunnuchelys by Danilov and Vitek (2012), but was not described in any detail. The two skulls were named Khunnuchelys sp. 1 and Khunnuchelys sp. 2. by them. The finder of the second skull was Mikhail E. Voskoboynikov, who allowed it to be studied by Lev I. Khosatzky.

K. lophorothon emends the original classification of the species, as the species name if derived from the name of Lophorhothon, the dinosaur it was originally classified under.

== Description ==
=== Skull ===
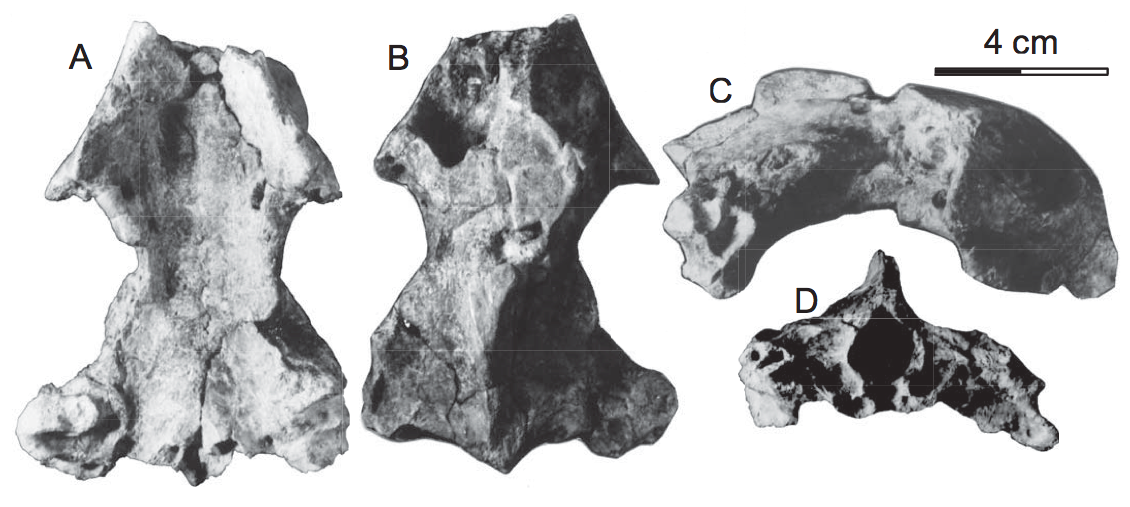
Skull ZIN PH 1/146, one of two skulls assigned to K. lophorhothon

Khunnuchelys is an extinct turtle is which many skulls are known from. In fact, is the only skull-based trionychid from the Cretaceous. The side of the maxillary makes up a beak-like structure, an unusual feature of trionychids. One skull, ZIN PH 1/146, is relatively small, and is only partly preserved. The maxilla and prefrontals of the specimen are only partly known, although the jugals, basioccipitals, supraoccipital crest, and left quadrate are close to complete. The preserved skull length is 9 cm (3.5 in), and the total approximate skull is 17 cm (6.7 in) long. The specimen is unique among Khunnuchelys, as the ventral edge is generally well-preserved. The ventral edge shows that the skull of Khunnuchelys is arched from the front to the back.

=== Distinguishing characteristics ===
A set of features unique among trionychids were identified by Brinkman et al. in 1993 during the description of Khunnuchelys erinhotensis and K. kisylkumensis. They are listed below:

- orbits facing strongly forwards;
- the suborbital region of the maxilla is deep;
- the palate is vaulted;
- the triturating surfaces of the maxilla and dentary are beaklike;
- the triturating surfaces of the maxillae meet at the midline, forming a mid-ventral ridge;
- the internal nares are located far posteriorly and are roofed by the palatines and maxillae;
- the anterolateral corner of the palatine and posterolateral corner of the maxilla are greatly enlarged to form about half of the triturating surface;
- the maxilla and jugal are swollen to form a broadly convex surface in dorsal view;
- the postorbital contacts the maxilla, excluding the jugal from the margin of the orbit;
- the roof of the skull is constricted to expose the palatine in dorsal view;
- the descending process of the parietal does not participate in the processus trochlearis oticum; a posteriorly facing occipital surface is bordered dorsally by a rounded ridge formed by the opisthotic and supraoccipital;
- a concave surface is present on the occiput above the fenestra postotica and lateral to the foramen magnum;
- the occipital surface of the exoccipital faces posteriorly;
- and nervi hypoglossi exiting via a single foramen in the exoccipital.

The characteristics would not be useful if Khunnuchelys was not a trionychid, but Brinkman et al. found that a classification as a trionychid was likely because of the features listed below:

- it is similar to Conchochelys in the presence of a deeply excavated palate, extensively developed secondary palate with broad contact of the maxillae at the midline, grooves extending backwards from the internal choanal openings, and short basioccipital region
- and it is similar to Dogania in that the prefrontal makes a small contribution to the orbit margin between the frontal and maxilla.

K. lophorothon is distinguished from the other species by the features listed below, found by Danilov et al. in its description:

- in that the palatines not only form the lateral walls of the grooves that open posteriorly from the apertura narium interna, but also form part of the floor of these grooves, leaving the grooves less ventrally exposed.

Both species can be differentiated from K. erinhotensis:

- in that the upper margin of the external nares is located dorsal to the ventral orbit margins, and in that the foramen jugularis posterius is confluent with the fenestra postotica.

== Classification ==
Khunnuchelys is a turtle that is grouped within Trionychinae, a subfamily of Trionychidae. The species "Trionyx" kansaiensis is known from shell fragments, that are from the same region of Kazakhstan as K. lophorothon, and might be from the later, in which case, "T." kansaiensis might be synonymous with K. lophorothon. Brinkman et al. found that Khunnuchelys was closely related to Conchochelys, but even though it is likely, Danilov et al. did not find any features to prove their close relationship.
