= "Trionyx" ikoviensis =

"Trionyx" ikoviensis Temporal range: Lutetian

Scientific classification
- Kingdom: Animalia
- Phylum: Chordata
- Class: Reptilia
- Order: Testudines
- Suborder: Cryptodira
- Clade: Pan-Trionychidae
- Genus: "Trionyx"
- Species: †"T." ikoviensis

Binomial name
- †"Trionyx" ikoviensis Danilov et al., 2011

Extinct species of turtle

"Trionyx" ikoviensis is an extinct species of softshell turtles which existed in what is now Ukraine during the early Lutetian age of the Eocene epoch.
