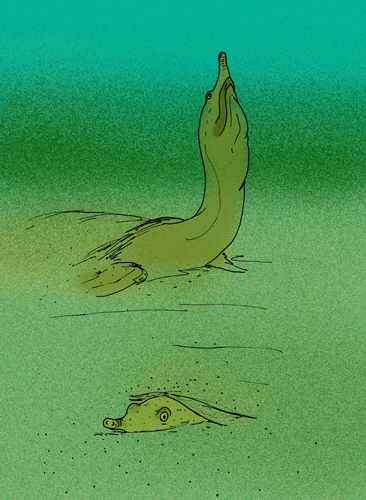
- Life restoration

Scientific classification
- Kingdom: Animalia
- Phylum: Chordata
- Class: Reptilia
- Order: Testudines
- Suborder: Cryptodira
- Clade: Pan-Trionychidae
- Genus: "Trionyx"
- Species: †"T." singularis

Binomial name
- †"Trionyx" singularis (Hay, 1907)

Synonyms
- Aspideretes singularis Hay, 1907; Aspideretes puercensis Hay, 1908; Aspideretes sagatus Hay, 1908

= "Trionyx" singularis =

"Trionyx" singularis Temporal range: Early Danian

Extinct species of prehistoric freshwaer softshell turtle

"Trionyx" singularis is an extinct species of prehistoric softshell turtle that inhabited freshwater habitats in interior western North America during the Early Paleocene.

It is known from the Nacimiento Formation & Denver Formation of New Mexico & Colorado, USA. It lived during the Puercan (66 to 63.3 million years ago) faunal stage, only shortly after the Cretaceous-Paleogene extinction event. It is one of a number of fossil softshell turtle species that is tentatively classified to the former wastebasket taxon genus Trionyx. It was initially described as Aspideretes singularis, and has also been previously placed in the genus Palaeotrionyx, but is presently just placed as "Trionyx". Remains are common in the San Juan Basin of New Mexico, and have previously been assigned to a number of species that are now considered synonymous with "T." singularis.
