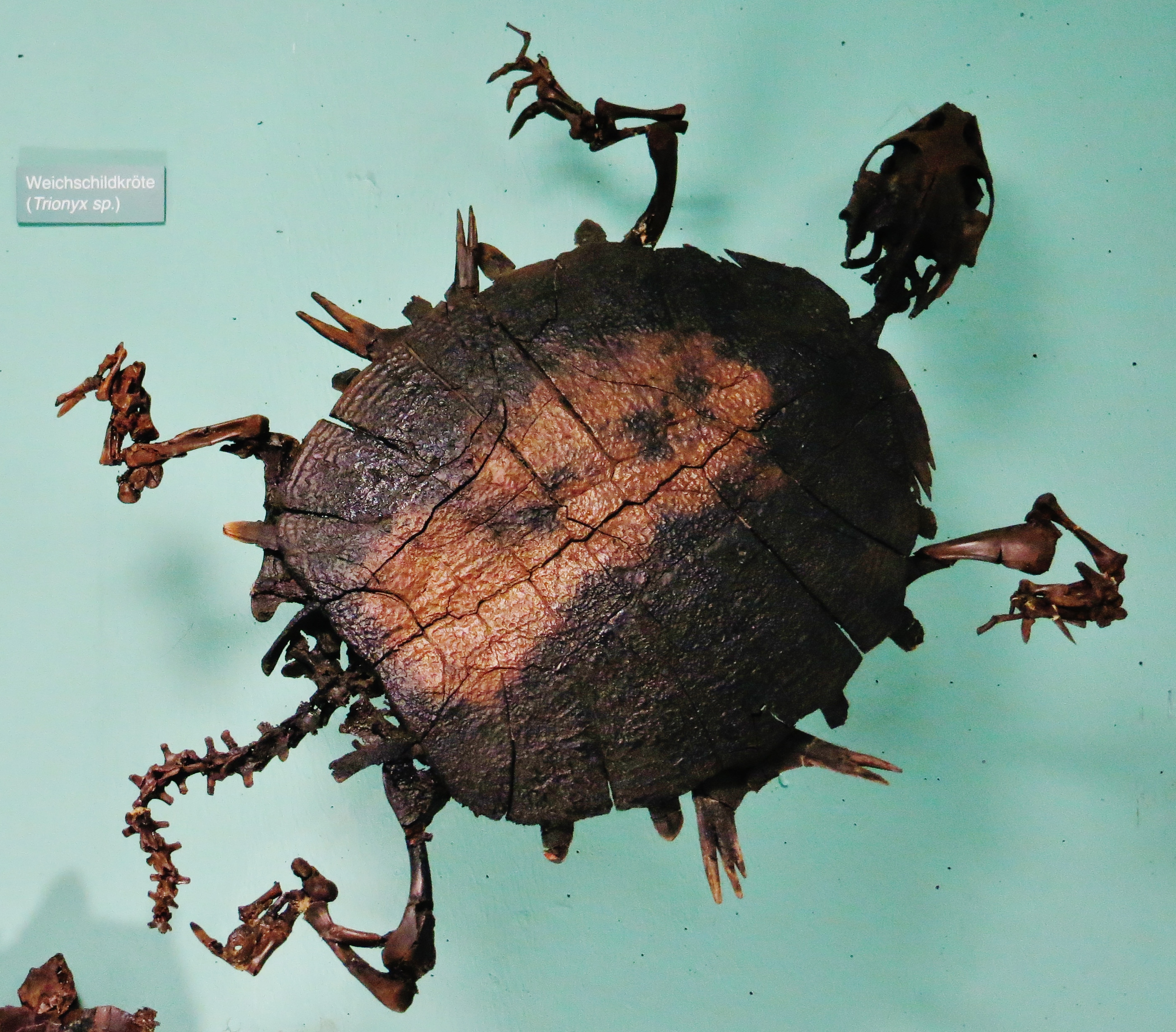
- Palaeoamyda messeliana from Messel Pit Fossil Site at the Naturmuseum Senckenberg

Scientific classification
- Domain: Eukaryota
- Kingdom: Animalia
- Phylum: Chordata
- Class: Reptilia
- Order: Testudines
- Suborder: Cryptodira
- Family: Trionychidae
- Subfamily: Trionychinae
- Genus: †Palaeoamyda; Cadena, 2016
- Species: †P. messeliana

Binomial name
- †Palaeoamyda messeliana (Reinach 1900)

= Palaeoamyda =

Palaeoamyda Temporal range: Middle Eocene

Extinct genus of turtles

Palaeoamyda is an extinct genus of softshell turtle belonging to the family Trionychidae. Remains have been found in the Eocene of Germany.

== Taxonomy ==
Karl (1998) considered Palaeoamyda a synonym of Rafetoides austriacus (Peters, 1858), but subsequent re-description of the material showed that it was a distinct genus in its own right.

== Description ==
Palaeoamyda is a three-clawed soft-shell turtle that can reach a length of about two feet. It is the largest species of turtles of Messel Pit Fossil Site. The carapace and plastron are not connected by bony prominences and the plastron shows bony plates reduced to small protrusions.
