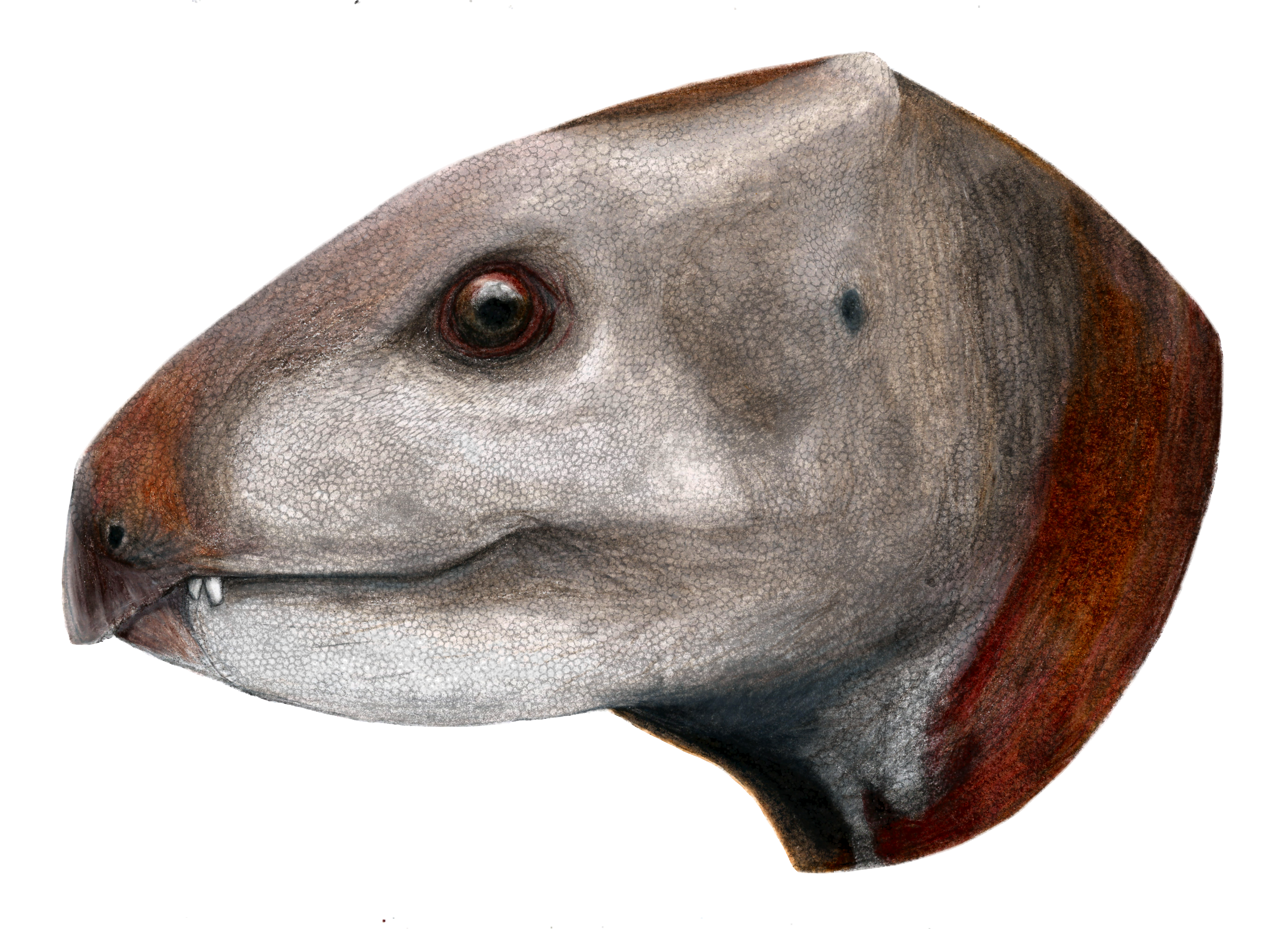
- Life restoration as a basal marginocephalian.

Scientific classification
- Kingdom: Animalia
- Phylum: Chordata
- Class: Reptilia
- Clade: Dinosauria
- Clade: †Ornithischia
- Clade: †Marginocephalia
- Genus: †Albalophosaurus; Ohashi & Barrett, 2009
- Species: †A. yamaguchiorum

Binomial name
- †Albalophosaurus yamaguchiorum Ohashi & Barrett, 2009

= Albalophosaurus =

Albalophosaurus Temporal range: Early Cretaceous, ?Valanginian–Hauterivian

Extinct genus of dinosaurs

Albalophosaurus (meaning 'white crest lizard') is a genus of marginocephalian ornithischian dinosaur that lived in Japan during the Early Cretaceous. The type species is Albalophosaurus yamaguchiorum.

== History of discovery ==
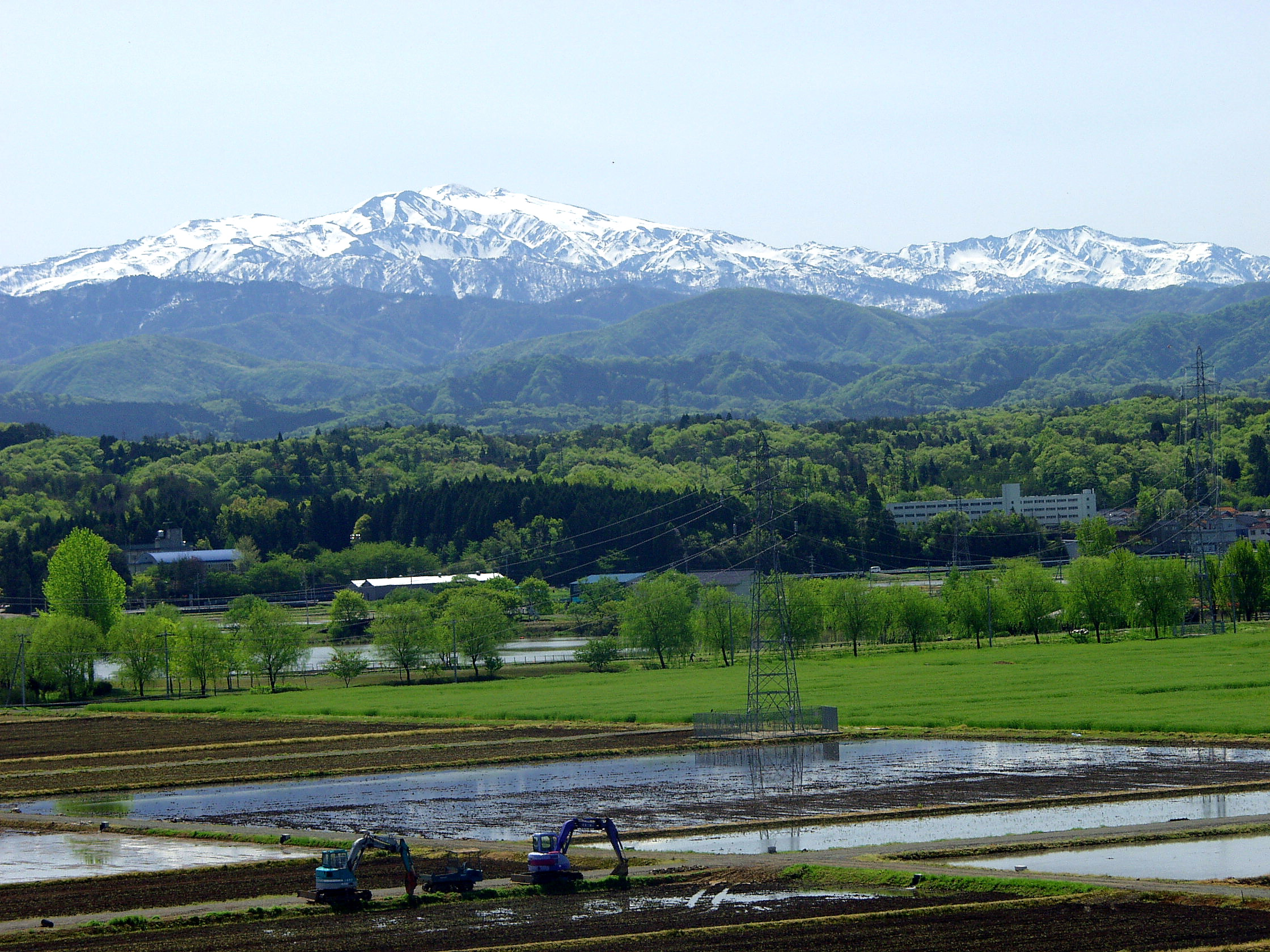
View of Mount Hakusan, the mountain Albalophosaurus was named after

Albalophosaurus was described in 2009 from remains found in 1997 by Yoshinori Kobayashi from the Kuwajima Formation of central Japan, outcropping in Hakusan in the Ishikawa Prefecture. The holotype, SBEI 176, consists of cranial bones from an incomplete, disarticulated skull and left lower jaw thought to belong to a single juvenile individual. The generic name is derived from Latin albus, "white", and Greek λόφος (lophos), "crest", a reference to the snow-covered crest of Mount Hakusan. The specific name honours Ichio Yamaguchi and Mikiko Yamaguchi, who discovered and prepared many fossils from the site.

The exact age of the strata from which the remains of Albalophosaurus have been found is not known because of the lack of marine beds containing index fossils, but the Kuwajima Formation is known to have formed during the Early Cretaceous, most likely after the Berriasian and before the Barremian based on the ages of underlying and overlying formations. More recent studies suggest that the age of the Kuwajima Formation is most likely Valanginian—Hauterivian, although the exact age is still uncertain.

== Phylogeny ==
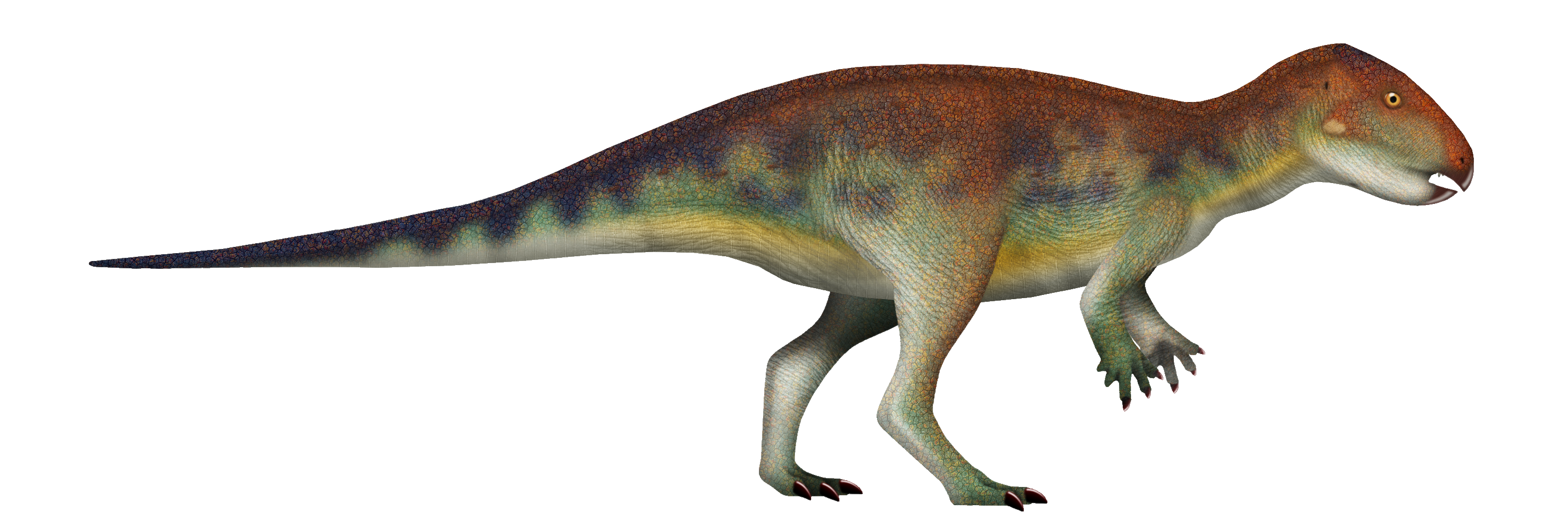
Life restoration with speculative body

Although Albalophosaurus was classified as a basal ceratopsian in a phylogenetic analysis conducted along with the description of the genus, only one ambiguous synapomorphy of the clade is present in the holotype, and none of the unambiguous synapomorphies that define Ceratopsia are present. Other characteristics, such as those of the dental morphology of Albalophosaurus, seem to suggest that the genus shares a relation to Ornithopoda. Thus the authors of the original description of the genus refer it to Cerapoda incertae sedis, and do not consider it to be a ceratopsian. Han et al. (2012) found Albalophosaurus to be a ceratopsian more derived than Micropachycephalosaurus, Yinlong, Stenopelix, and Chaoyangosaurus, but basal to a clade composed of Psittacosaurus and more derived ceratopsians. However, Fonseca et al. (2024) suggested that the definitive taxonomic placement of Albalophosaurus is still uncertain, since various results of their phylogenetic analyses recovered this genus as a basal ceratopsian, a possible basal pachycephalosaurian, or a sister taxon of Marginocephalia.
