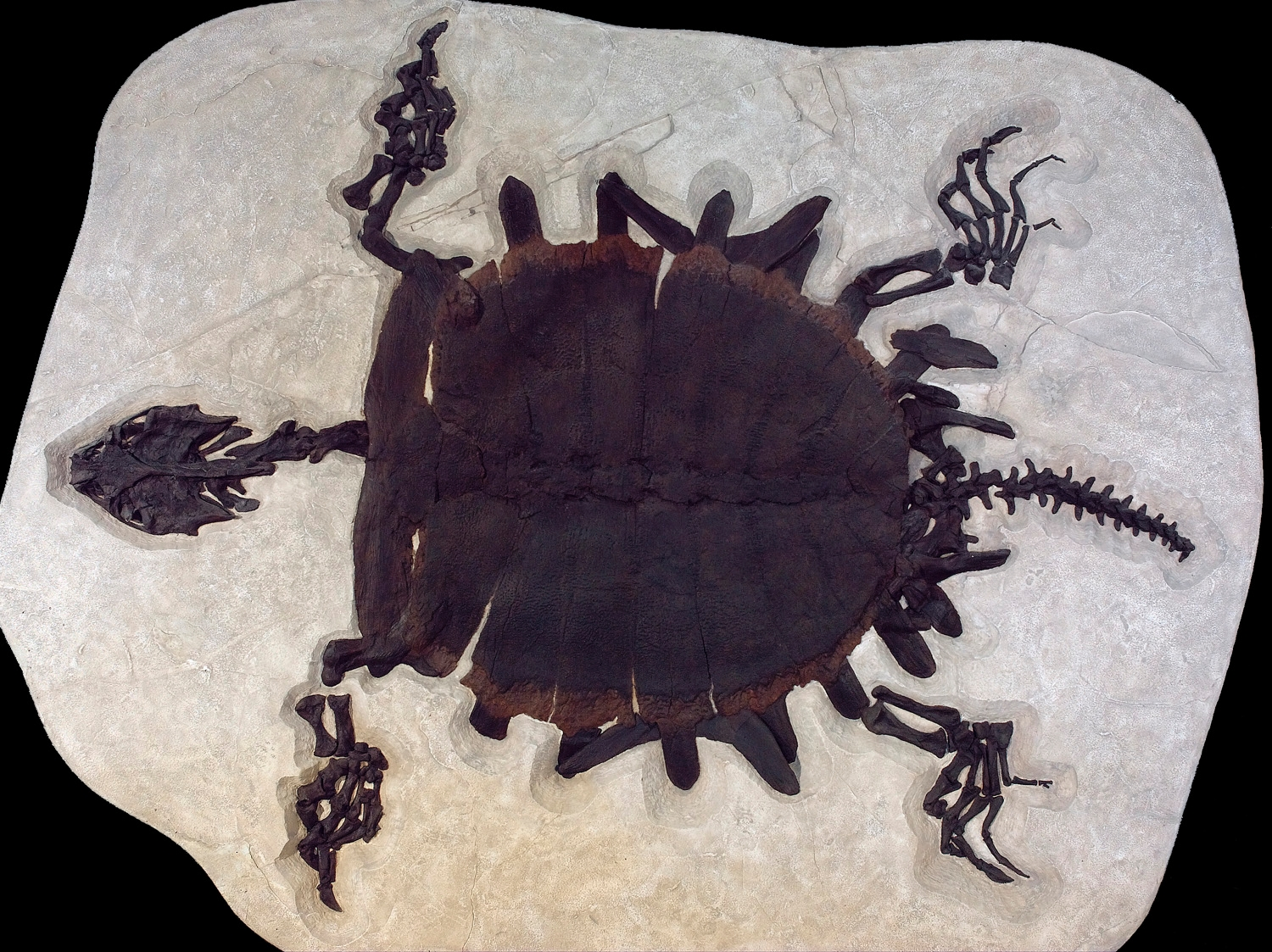
- A. byssina

Scientific classification
- Kingdom: Animalia
- Phylum: Chordata
- Class: Reptilia
- Order: Testudines
- Suborder: Cryptodira
- Family: Trionychidae
- Subfamily: Trionychinae
- Genus: †Axestemys; Hay, 1899

Species
- †A. byssina (Cope, 1872); †A. cerevisia Vitek, 2012; †A. montinsana Vitek, 2012; †A. quinni (Schmidt, 1945); †A. splendida (Hay, 1908); †A. vittata (Pomel, 1847); †A. infernalis (Joyce, Brinkman & Lyson, 2019)

Synonyms
- Axestus Cope, 1872; Conchochelys Hay, 1905; Eurycephalochelys Moody & Walker, 1970; Paleotrionyx Schmidt, 1945

= Axestemys =

Axestemys Temporal range: Campanian–Bridgerian

Extinct genus of turtles

Axestemys is an extinct genus of softshell turtle that lived from the Late Cretaceous to the Eocene in western North America and Europe.

Axestemys, like its modern relatives, had no scutes on its carapace, which probably had leathery, pliable skin at the sides. Despite living several million years ago, Axestemys would have looked very similar to its modern relatives, with a long neck, a sharp beak, and three toes on each foot. All species of Axestemys grew to a large size, especially A. byssina, that could reach a total length of 2 metres (79 in) or more, being larger than any modern day species of softshell turtle. Based on the diet of modern softshell turtles, it was an omnivore, eating water plants, invertebrates, and perhaps small fish.

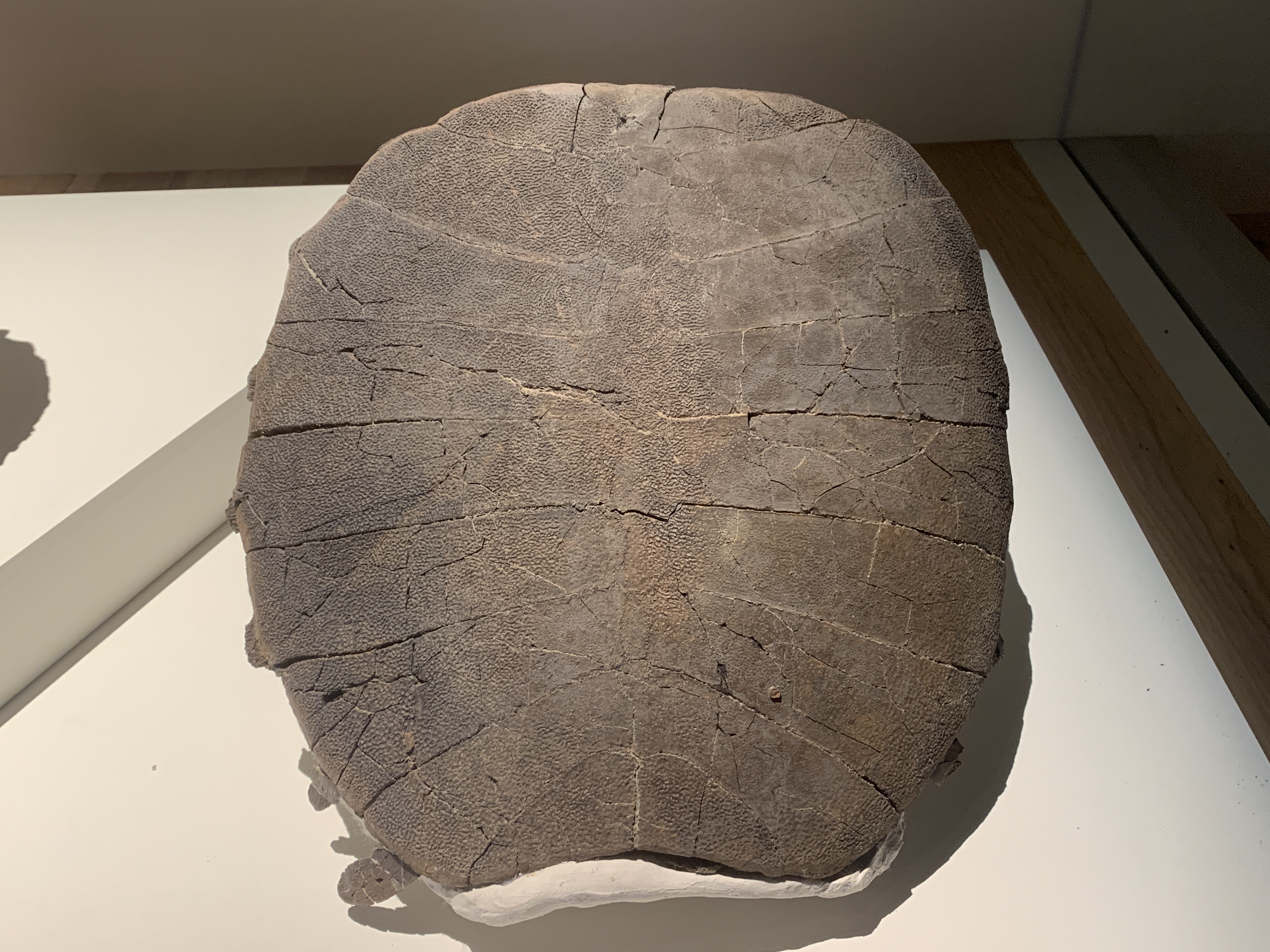
A. infernalis carapace, Hell Creek Formation (66 Mya).

A specimen of A. splendida was identified when a study by Arbour et al. proposed that the presumed Dakotaraptor furculae in fact represented a part of a turtle’s armor, the entoplastron of Axestemys splendida, a member of Trionychidae. In 2016, DePalma et al. recognized that none of the referred furculae actually belonged to Dakotaraptor and excluded them from its hypodigm.

== See also ==
- Drazinderetes, another enormous trionychid
- Stupendemys, a giant prehistoric freshwater side-necked turtle
- Archelon, a giant sea turtle of the Cretaceous
- Largest prehistoric animals
