= "Trionyx" kansaiensis =

"Trionyx" kansaiensis Temporal range: Early Santonian to Late Campanian (Late Cretaceous)

Scientific classification
- Kingdom: Animalia
- Phylum: Chordata
- Class: Reptilia
- Order: Testudines
- Suborder: Cryptodira
- Clade: Pan-Trionychidae
- Genus: "Trionyx"
- Species: †"T." kansaiensis

Binomial name
- †"Trionyx" kansaiensis Vitek and Danilov 2010

Extinct species of turtle

Trionyx kansaiensis is an extinct species of softshell turtle uncovered from the Late Cretaceous of Tajikistan and Qyzylorda, Kazakhstan.Fossil evidence from the Bissekty Formation in Uzbekistan indicate that the Trionyx Kansaiensis or a closely related species were more widely spread across Central Asia during the Late Cretaceous than research previously showed (Vitek, 2013). Other fossils from the Bostobe Formation suggest that this species lived in river and delta environments. T. Kansaiensis’ shell anatomy shows intermediate traits between very early and modern day trionychids, suggesting that it came along somewhere in the middle of the evolutionary history of the species (Vitek and Danilov, 2010).
