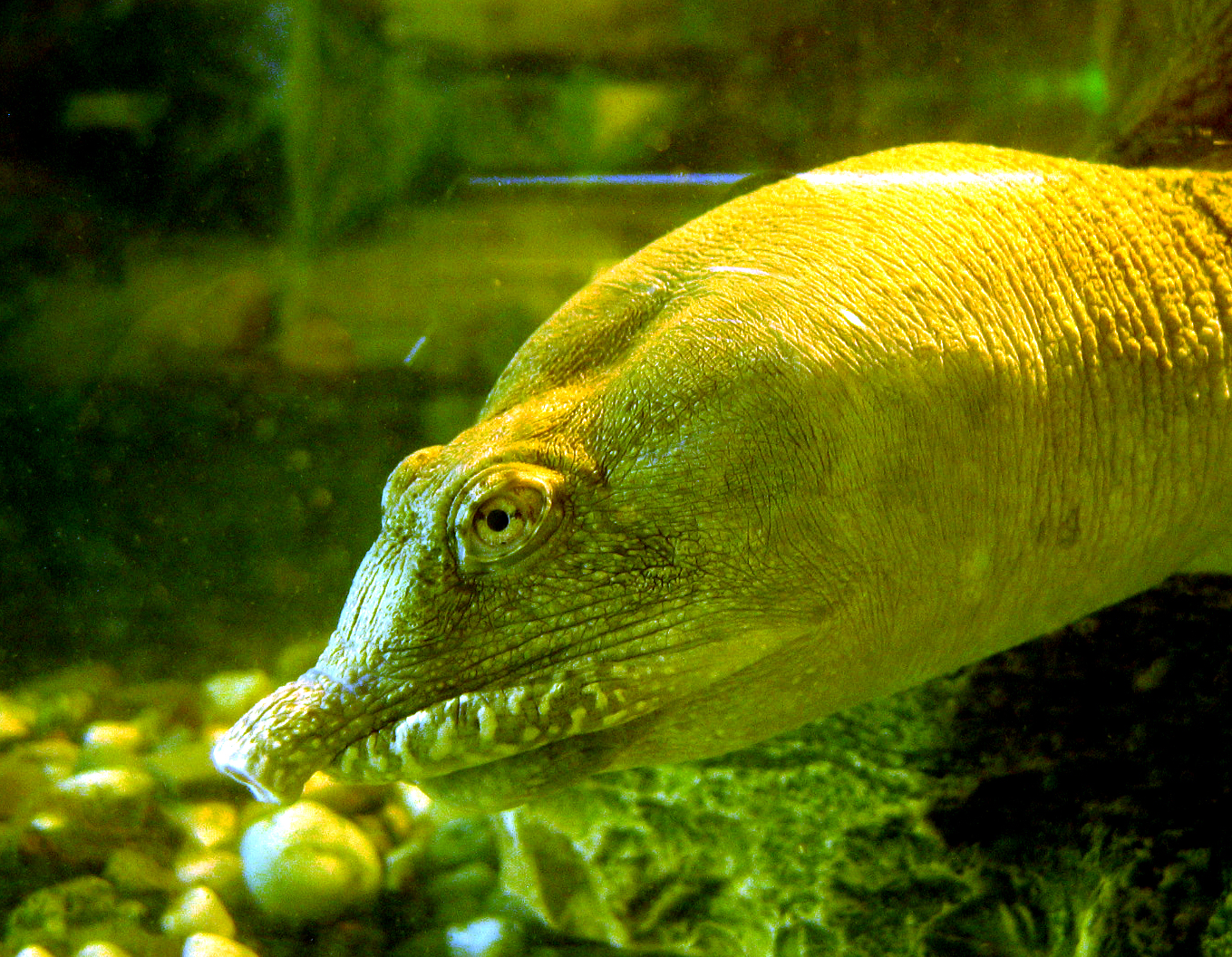
- Chinese softshell turtle Pelodiscus sinensis

Scientific classification
- Kingdom: Animalia
- Phylum: Chordata
- Class: Reptilia
- Order: Testudines
- Suborder: Cryptodira
- Family: Trionychidae
- Subfamily: Trionychinae; Gray, 1825

= Trionychinae =

Trionychinae Temporal range: Late Cretaceous to Present, 91–0 Ma

Subfamily of turtles

The Trionychinae are a subfamily of turtles in the family Trionychidae.

== Classification ==
The subfamily has 11 extant genera:

- Amyda
- Apalone
- †Axestemys
- Chitra
- Dogania
- †Drazinderetes
- †Gobiapalone
- †Khunnuchelys
- †Kuhnemys
- †Murgonemys
- Nilssonia
- †Oliveremys
- Palea
- †Palaeoamyda
- Pelochelys
- Pelodiscus
- †Perochelys
- †Rafetoides (nomen dubium)
- Rafetus
- Trionyx
