= Kuroyuriella =

Kuroyuriella Temporal range: Barremian

Scientific classification
- Kingdom: Animalia
- Phylum: Chordata
- Class: Reptilia
- Order: Squamata
- Genus: †Kuroyuriella; Evans & Matsumoto, 2015
- Species: †K. mikikoi

Binomial name
- †Kuroyuriella mikikoi Evans & Matsumoto, 2015

Extinct genus of reptiles

Kuroyuriella is an extinct genus of lizard that lived during the Barremian stage of the Early Cretaceous epoch.

== Distribution ==
Kuroyuriella mikikoi is known from the Kuwajima Formation of Japan.
