= Cuvieribaena =

Cuvieribaena Temporal range: Bartonian

Scientific classification
- Kingdom: Animalia
- Phylum: Chordata
- Class: Reptilia
- Order: Squamata
- Clade: Amphisbaenia
- Family: Blanidae
- Genus: †Cuvieribaena
- Species: †C. carlgansi

Binomial name
- †Cuvieribaena carlgansi Čerňanský et al., 2015

Extinct genus of reptiles

Cuvieribaena is an extinct genus of blanid that lived during the Bartonian stage of the Eocene epoch.

== Distribution ==
Cuvieribaena carlgansi is known from France.
