= Sternotherus bonevalleyensis =

Sternotherus bonevalleyensis Temporal range: Messinian–Zanclean

Scientific classification
- Kingdom: Animalia
- Phylum: Chordata
- Class: Reptilia
- Order: Testudines
- Suborder: Cryptodira
- Family: Kinosternidae
- Genus: Sternotherus
- Species: †S. bonevalleyensis

Binomial name
- †Sternotherus bonevalleyensis Bourque and Schubert, 2015

Extinct species of turtle

Sternotherus bonevalleyensis is an extinct species of kinosternid turtle in the genus Sternotherus that lived in North America during the end of the Hemphillian North American land mammal age.

== Etymology ==
The specific epithet of the species derives from the Bone Valley Formation of Florida, the geological formation in which fossils of the species were found.
