= Taraschelon =

Taraschelon Temporal range: Rupelian

Scientific classification
- Kingdom: Animalia
- Phylum: Chordata
- Class: Reptilia
- Order: Testudines
- Suborder: Cryptodira
- Family: Testudinidae
- Genus: †Taraschelon; Pérez-García, 2015

Type species
- Taraschelon gigas Bravard, 1844

Extinct genus of tortoises

Taraschelon is an extinct genus of testudinid that lived in what is now France during the Rupelian stage of the Cenozoic era. It is known from a single species, T. gigas.
