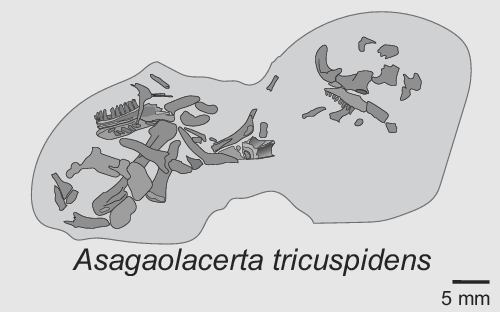
- Line drawing of type specimen

Scientific classification
- Kingdom: Animalia
- Phylum: Chordata
- Class: Reptilia
- Order: Squamata
- Genus: †Asagaolacerta; Evans & Matsumoto, 2015
- Species: †A. tricuspidens

Binomial name
- †Asagaolacerta tricuspidens Evans & Matsumoto, 2015

= Asagaolacerta =

Asagaolacerta Temporal range: Barremian

Extinct genus of reptiles

Asagaolacerta is an extinct genus of lizard that lived during the Barremian stage of the Early Cretaceous epoch.

== Distribution ==
Asagaolacerta tricuspidens is known from the Kuwajima Formation of Japan.
