= Kuwajima Formation =

Early Cretaceous geologic formation in Japan

- Stratigraphic range: Barremian
- Unit of: Tetori Group
- Sub-units: Lower Member, Upper Member
- Underlies: Akaiwa Formation
- Overlies: Gomijima Formation

Lithology
- Primary: Sandstone, Mudstone

Location
- Country: Japan

The Kuwajima Formation is an Early Cretaceous geologic formation in Japan. Its precise age is uncertain due to a lack of identifying fossils, and it was previously considered likely Valanginian to Hauterivian in age. However, it is now considered to probably be Barremian in age. Dinosaurs and other vertebrates has been recovered from the Kaseki-kabe "Fossil-bluff" locality in the uppermost part of the formation.

The multituberculate mammals Hakusanobaatar matsuoi and Tedoribaatar reini are known from the Kuwajima Formation. A member of Tritylodontidae, Montirictus kuwajimaensis, has also been recovered from the unit.

== Vertebrate Paleobiota ==
After Matsuoka et al. (2002)

=== Fish ===
Fish reported from the Kuwajima Formation
Genus	Species	Location	Stratigraphic position	Material	Notes	Images
Sinamia	S. kukurihime			Mostly complete skeleton	An amiiform fish related to bowfins	
Tetoriichthys	T. kuwajimaensis				The oldest record of Osteoglossiform	
Lepidotes	L. sp.					
Pachycormidae	Indeterminate			Jaw		

=== Amphibians ===
Amphibians reported from the Kuwajima Formation
Genus	Species	Location	Stratigraphic position	Material	Notes	Images
Shirerpeton	S. isajii	Kaseki-kabe	Facies III	Partial disarticulated skull	Albanerpetontid	Shirerpeton
Anura	Indeterminate			Isolated longbone, as well as a partial skeleton "composed of a few skull elements and several postcranial bones, including the femur, ilium, and vertebrae"	Partial skeleton belongs to a basal frog that lies outside of Neobatrachia.	

=== Choristoderes ===
Choristoderes reported from the Kuwajima Formation
Genus	Species	Location	Stratigraphic position	Material	Notes	Images
Monjurosuchus	M. sp.	Kaseki-kabe	Facies III			Monjurosuchus
Neochoristodera	Indeterminate		Facies I		The first report of a neochoristodere from Japan	Monjurosuchus
Choristodera	Indeterminate	Kaseki-kabe	Facies III			Monjurosuchus

=== Squamates ===
Squamates reported from the Kuwajima Formation
Genus	Species	Location	Stratigraphic position	Material	Notes	Images
Asagaolacerta	A. tricuspidens	Kaseki-kabe	Facies III	"An association of skull, jaws and postcranial bones of a small lizard with facetted tricuspid teeth, possibly a right maxilla"		Kaganaias
Hakuseps	H. imberis	Kaseki-kabe	Facies III	An almost complete left dentary		Kaganaias
Kaganaias	K. hakusanensis	Kaseki-kabe	Facies III	"Part and counterpart of articulated partial skeleton comprising parts of the dors. vert. series and parts of the tail, pelvis, and hind limbs"		Kaganaias
Kuroyuriella	K. mikikoi	Kaseki-kabe	Facies III	"A disarticulated skull on four originally conjoined blocks, an association on two small blocks"		Kaganaias
Kuwajimalla	K. kagaensis	Kaseki-kabe	Facies III			Kaganaias
Sakurasaurus	Indeterminate	Kaseki-kabe	Facies III	"Small block with disarticulated association of skull bones, vertebrae, ribs, pelvis and hindlimb bones"		Kaganaias
Paramacellodidae	Indeterminate	Kaseki-kabe	Facies III			Kaganaias
Squamata	Indeterminate	Kaseki-kabe	Facies III		Five distinct taxa	Kaganaias

=== Dinosaurs ===
Dinosaurs reported from the Kuwajima Formation
Genus	Species	Location	Stratigraphic position	Material	Notes	Images
Albalophosaurus	A. yamaguchiorum	Kaseki-kabe	Facies III	Partial skull and lower jaws		Albalophosaurus
Dromaeosauridae	Indeterminate	Kaseki-kabe	Facies III			
Enantiornithes	Indeterminate	Kaseki-kabe	Facies III			
Ornithischia	Indeterminate			Right dentary, left maxilla, isolated teeth	Distinct from Albalophosaurus	
Sauropoda ("Oharasisaurus")	Indeterminate	Kaseki-kabe	Facies III		Tooth	
Styracosterna	Indeterminate			Maxillary and dental teeth		

=== Other reptiles ===
Choristoderes reported from the Kuwajima Formation
Genus	Species	Location	Stratigraphic position	Material	Notes	Images
Trionychidae	Indeterminate	Kaseki-kabe				
Testudinoidea	Indeterminate	Kaseki-kabe				
Sinemydidae	Indeterminate	Kaseki-kabe				
Ornithocheiridae	Indeterminate	Kaseki-kabe				
Gnathosaurinae	Indeterminate	Kaseki-kabe				
Dsungaripteroidea?	Indeterminate	Kaseki-kabe				

=== Mammaliamorphs ===
Mammaliamorphs reported from the Kuwajima Formation
Genus	Species	Location	Stratigraphic position	Material	Notes	Images
Hakusanobaatar	H. matsuoi	Kaseki-kabe	Facies III	Dentary fragments and teeth	Eobaatarid	Hakusanobaatar
Hakusanodon	H. archaeus	Kaseki-kabe	Facies III		Eutriconodont	
Montirictus	M. kuwajimaensis	Kaseki-kabe	Facies III		Tritylodontid	
Tedoribaatar	T. reini	Kaseki-kabe	Facies III	"Fragment of right lower jaw with p4"	Eobaatarid	
Multituberculata	Indeterminate	Kaseki-kabe	Facies III			

== Invertebrate Paleobiota ==
Invertebrates reported from the Kuwajima Formation
Genus	Species	Location	Stratigraphic position	Material	Notes	Images
Nipponoridium	B. matsuoi	Kaseki-Kabe			Mimarachnid hemipteran	
Nipponohagla	N. kaga	Kaseki-Kabe			Prophalangopsid	
Kagapsychops	K. araneus	Kaseki-Kabe			Psychopsid	
Coleoptera	Indeterminate	Kaseki-Kabe				
Margaritifera	M. ogamigoensis	Kaseki-Kabe			Previously classified as Unio ogamigoensis.	
Nakamuranaia	N. kagaensis	Kaseki-Kabe			Trigonioidoid bivalve; previously considered to be ?Unio ogamigoensis.	
Sphaerium	S. sp.	Kaseki-Kabe			Sphaeriid	
Viviparus	V. onogoensis	Kaseki-Kabe			Viviparid	
Micromelania	M.? katoensis	Kaseki-Kabe				
Physidae	Indeterminate, two species	Kaseki-Kabe				
Pupilloidea	Indeterminate	Kaseki-Kabe				

== See also ==
- List of dinosaur-bearing rock formations
