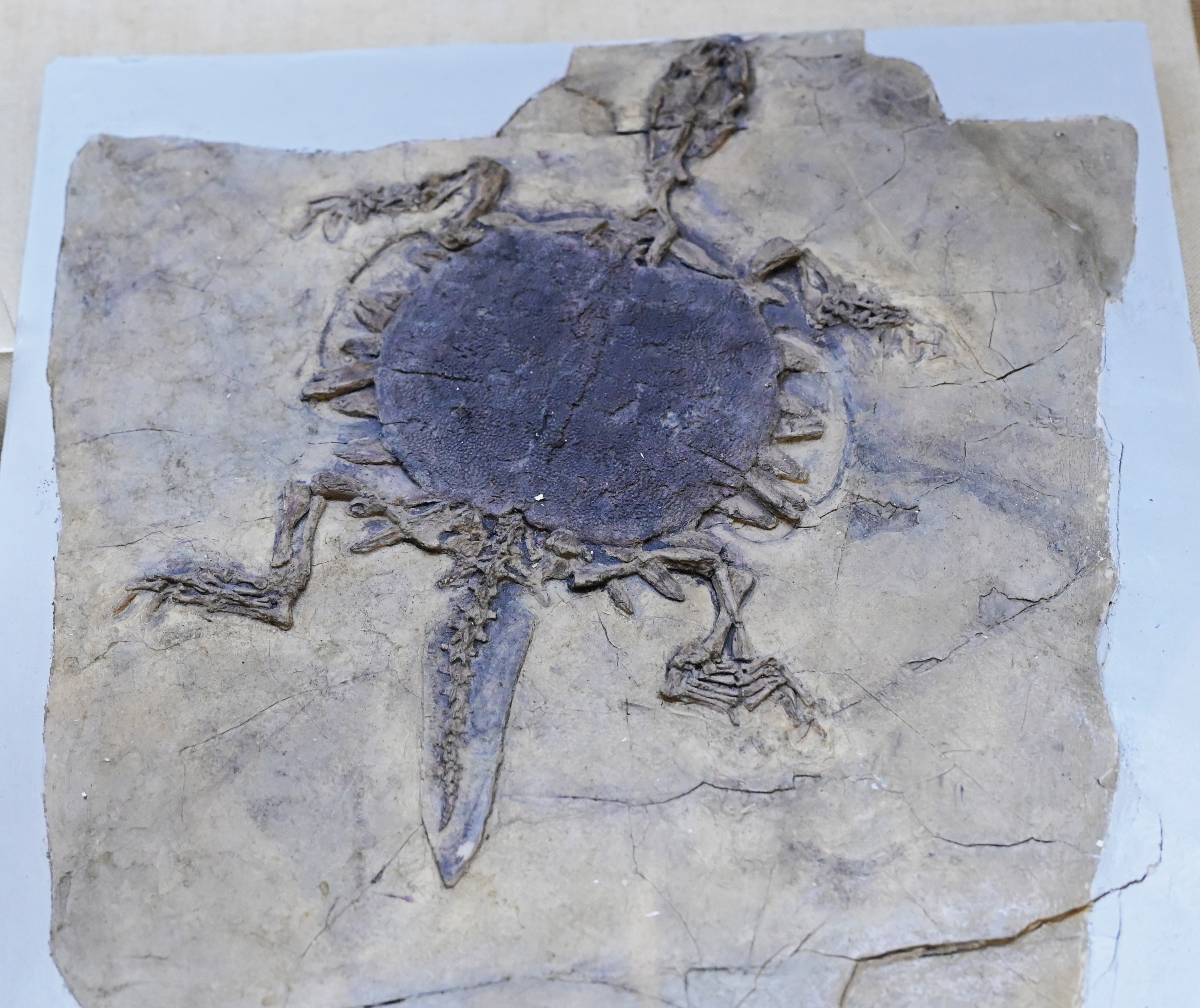
- Holotype specimen of P. lamadongensis (IVPP V18048), Paleozoological Museum of China

Scientific classification
- Kingdom: Animalia
- Phylum: Chordata
- Class: Reptilia
- Order: Testudines
- Suborder: Cryptodira
- Family: Trionychidae
- Subfamily: Trionychinae
- Genus: †Perochelys; Li et al., 2015

Type species
- Perochelys lamadongensis

= Perochelys =

Perochelys Temporal range: Aptian

Extinct genus of turtles

Perochelys is an extinct genus of turtle that inhabited Liaoning during the Aptian. It is known from a single species, P. lamadongensis.
