= Kimurachelys =

Kimurachelys Temporal range: Campanian

Scientific classification
- Kingdom: Animalia
- Phylum: Chordata
- Class: Reptilia
- Order: Testudines
- Suborder: Cryptodira
- Superfamily: Chelonioidea
- Genus: †Kimurachelys; Brinkman et al., 2015

Type species
- Kimurachelys slobodae

Extinct genus of turtles

Kimurachelys is an extinct genus of chelonioid that inhabited Alberta during the Campanian stage of the Late Cretaceous epoch. It is a monotypic genus known from a single species, K. slobodae.
