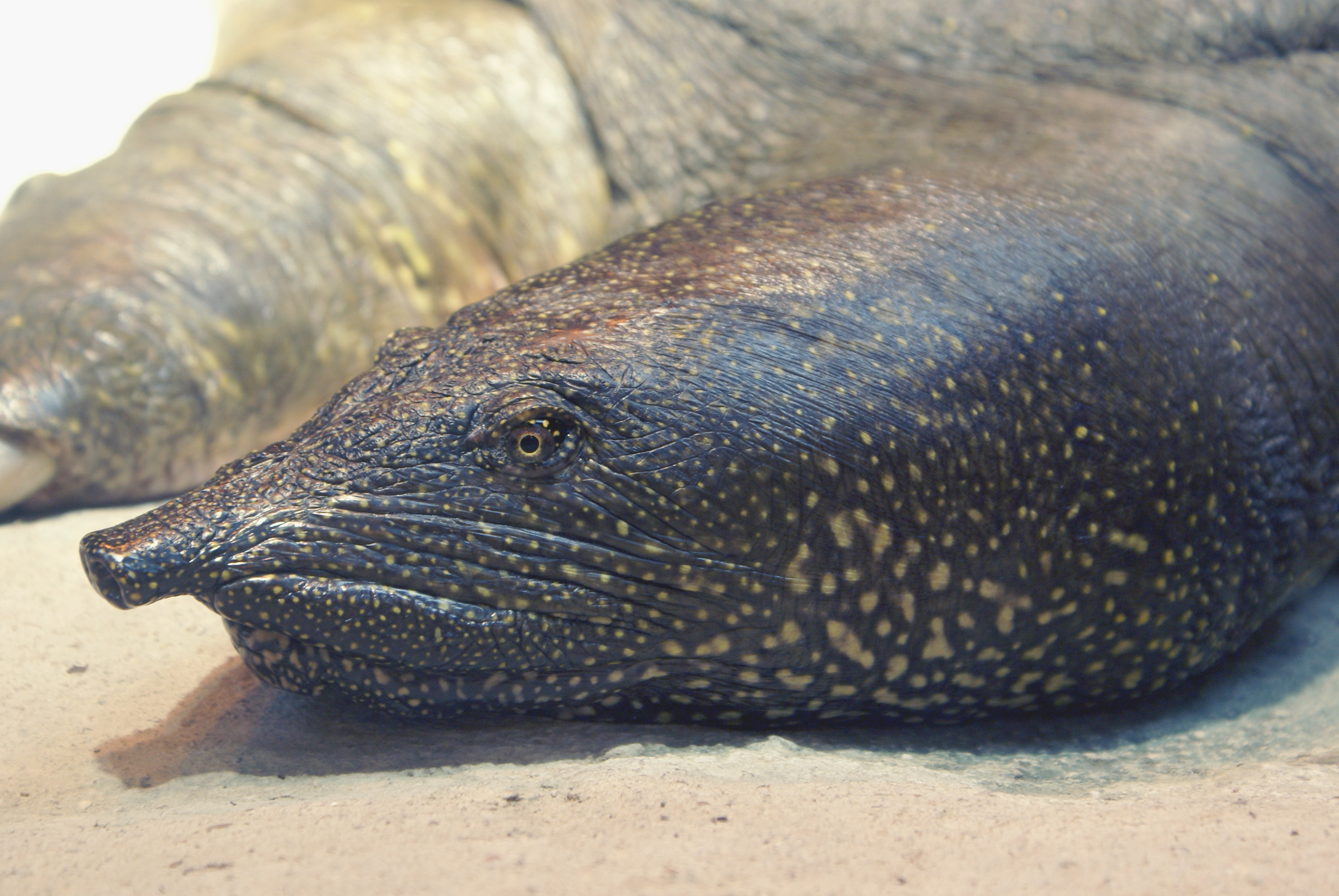
- T. triunguis, the only extant species

Scientific classification
- Kingdom: Animalia
- Phylum: Chordata
- Class: Reptilia
- Order: Testudines
- Suborder: Cryptodira
- Family: Trionychidae
- Subfamily: Trionychinae
- Genus: Trionyx; Geoffroy Saint-Hilaire, 1809

Synonyms
- Aspidonectes Wagler, 1830

= Trionyx =

Trionyx Temporal range: Miocene to recent, 23–0 Ma

Genus of turtles

Trionyx is a genus of softshell turtles belonging to the family Trionychidae. In the past many species in the family were classified in this genus, but today T. triunguis, the African or Nile softshell turtle, is the only extant softshell still classified as Trionyx. The other species still assigned to this genus are only known from fossils. T. triunguis is a relatively large, aquatic piscivore.

== Species ==
The list of species follows a 2017 review of the Trionychidae by Georgios L. Georgalis and Walter G. Joyce.

- Trionyx triunguis (Forsskål, 1775) – African or Nile softshell turtle
- † Trionyx pliocenicus Fucini, 1912 – Pliocene of Tuscany (Italy)
- † Trionyx vindobonensis (Peters, 1855) – Miocene of Vienna (Austria)

The following species are considered valid trionychid taxa, but with uncertain phylogenetic relationships. They are only referred to Trionyx provisionally due to its historic status as a wastebasket taxon. The species from North America follow a 2015 review by Natasha S. Vitek and Walter G. Joyce and the species from Europe and Asia follow the 2017 review by Georgalis and Joyce.

- † "Trionyx" admirabilis (Hay, 1905) – Paleocene of New Mexico (United States)
- † "Trionyx" aequa (Hay, 1908) – Eocene of Wyoming (United States)
- † "Trionyx" allani (Gilmore, 1923) – Late Cretaceous of Alberta (Canada)
- † "Trionyx" austerus (Hay, 1908) – Late Cretaceous of New Mexico (United States)
- † "Trionyx" baynshirensis Danilov et al., 2014 – Middle Cretaceous of Dornogovi Aimag (Mongolia)
- † "Trionyx" beecheri (Hay, 1904) – Late Cretaceous of Wyoming (United States)
- † "Trionyx" boulengeri Reinach, 1900 – Oligocene of Rhineland-Palatinate (Germany)
- † "Trionyx" capellinii Negri, 1892 – Eocene of Veneto (Italy)
- † "Trionyx" dissolutus Vitek & Danilov, 2014 – Late Cretaceous of Navoiy Region (Uzbekistan)
- † "Trionyx" ellipticus (Hay, 1908) – Eocene of Utah (United States)
- † "Trionyx" eloisae (Gilmore, 1919) – Paleocene of New Mexico (United States)
- † "Trionyx" foveatus Leidy, 1857 – Late Cretaceous of Montana (United States)
- † "Trionyx" gilbentuensis Danilov et al., 2014 – Late Cretaceous of Ömnögovi Aimag (Mongolia)
- † "Trionyx" gobiensis Danilov et al., 2014 – Late Cretaceous of Ömnögovi Aimag (Mongolia)
- † "Trionyx" gregarius (Gilmore, 1934) – Eocene of Inner Mongolia (China)
- † "Trionyx" henrici Owen, 1849 – Eocene of Hampshire (United Kingdom)
- † "Trionyx" ikoviensis Danilov et al., 2011 – Eocene of Luhansk (Ukraine)
- † "Trionyx" impressus (Yeh, 1963) – Eocene of Yuangdong Province (China)
- † "Trionyx" latus (Gilmore, 1919) – Late Cretaceous of Alberta (Canada)
- † "Trionyx" leucopotamicus Cope, 1891 – Eocene of Saskatchewan (Canada)
- † "Trionyx" johnsoni Gilmore, 1931 – Eocene of Inner Mongolia (China)
- † "Trionyx" kansaiensis Vitek & Danilov, 2010 – Late Cretaceous of Khodzhent Province (Tajikistan)
- † "Trionyx" linchuensis (Yeh, 1962) – Eocene of Shandong Province (China)
- † "Trionyx" messelianus Reinach, 1900 – Eocene of Hesse (Germany)
- † "Trionyx" miensis Okazaki and Yoshida, 1977 – Pliocene of Mie Prefecture (Japan)
- † "Trionyx" miocaenus (Matthew, 1924) – Eocene of Wyoming (United States)
- † "Trionyx" minusculus (Chkhikvadze, 1973) – Eocene of East Kazakhstan Region (Kazakhstan)
- † "Trionyx" mira (Hay, 1908) – Eocene of Wyoming (United States)
- † "Trionyx" ninae Chkhikvadze, 1971 – Oligocene of Karagandy Region (Kazakhstan)
- † "Trionyx" onomatoplokos Georgalis & Joyce, 2017 – Late Cretaceous of Kyzylorda Region (Kazakhstan)
- † "Trionyx" reesidei (Gilmore, 1919) – Paleocene of New Mexico (United States)
- † "Trionyx" riabinini Kuznetsov & Chkhikvadze, 1987 – Late Cretaceous of Kyzylorda Region (Kazakhstan)
- † "Trionyx" robustus (Gilmore, 1919) – Late Cretaceous of New Mexico (United States)
- † "Trionyx" shiluutulensis Danilov et al., 2014 – Late Cretaceous of Ömnögovi Aimag (Mongolia)
- † "Trionyx" silvestris Walker & Moody, 1974 – Eocene of Kent (United Kingdom)
- † "Trionyx" singularis (Hay, 1907) – Paleocene of New Mexico (United States)
- † "Trionyx" uintaensis Leidy, 1873 – Eocene of Wyoming (United States)
- † "Trionyx" vegetus (Gilmore, 1919) – Paleocene of New Mexico (United States)
- † "Trionyx" yixiensis Li, Tong et al., 2015 – Early Cretaceous of Heilongjiang Province (China)

† = extinct
