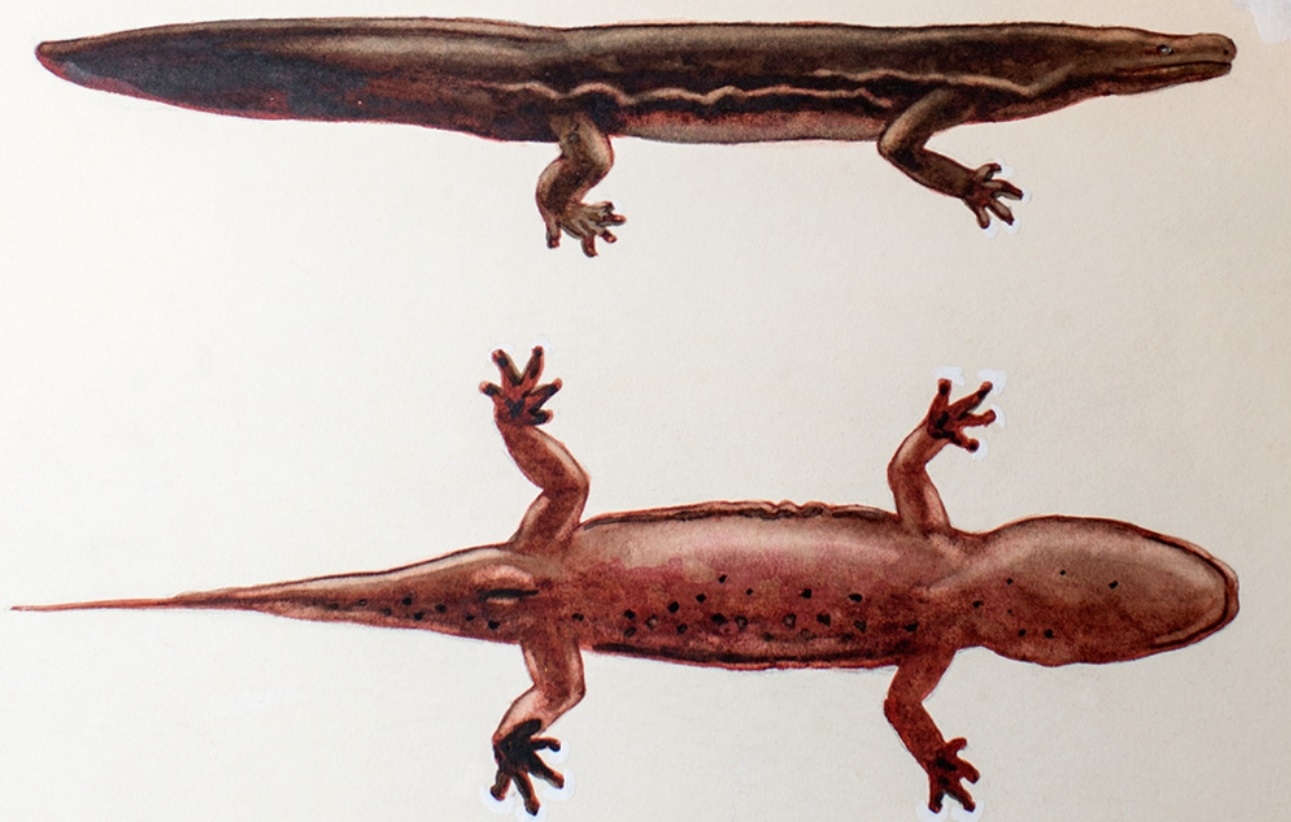

Conservation status
- Critically Endangered (IUCN 3.1)
- CITES Appendix I

Scientific classification
- Kingdom: Animalia
- Phylum: Chordata
- Class: Amphibia
- Order: Urodela
- Family: Cryptobranchidae
- Genus: Andrias
- Species: A. sligoi

Binomial name
- Andrias sligoi (E.G. Boulenger, 1924)

Synonyms
- Megalobatrachus sligoi E.G. Boulenger, 1924

= South China giant salamander =

Species of amphibian

The South China giant salamander (Andrias sligoi) is a species of very large salamander in the family Cryptobranchidae. The species is endemic to southern China, where it occurs mainly in the Pearl River basin south of the Nanling Mountains. It may be the largest species of salamander and the largest amphibian in the world. It is extremely endangered and nearly extinct in the wild.

== Discovery ==
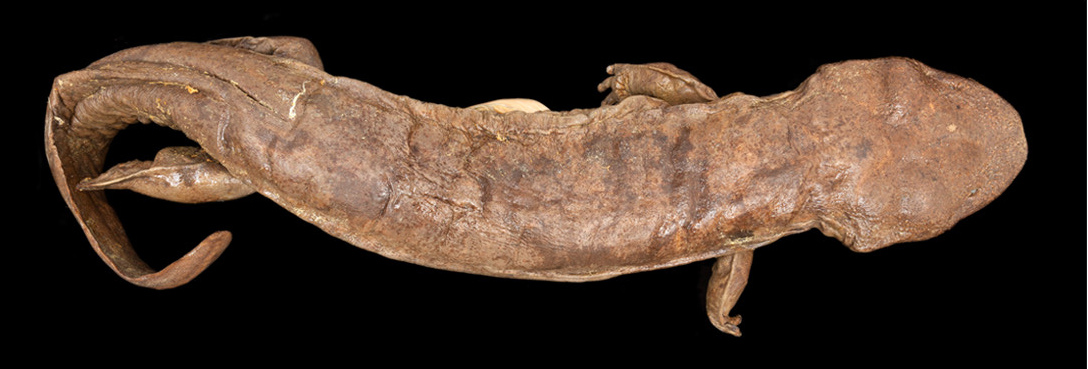
A preserved specimen of A. sligoi

Andrias sligoi was described as a species new to science in 1924 as Megalobatrachus sligoi by British zoologist Edward George Boulenger from a captive specimen held in the London Zoo. This specimen had been held originally in the Hong Kong Zoological and Botanical Gardens and may have originated from Guangxi or Guangdong Province. It was likely one of many giant salamanders which had been captured from the mainland and placed in the Botanical Gardens' fountain, all of which escaped. Some speculate the salamanders were a type of temple offering. During a particularly violent storm in April 1920, a large drain pipe in the gardens burst, carving a large depression into the land that the escaped salamander was washed into. It was captured and kept in a large circular basin, where it was fed daily with live tadpoles and occasionally bits of beef.

The captured salamander was later seen by George Ulick Browne, the then-Marquess of Sligo, as he was touring the area. Browne persuaded the then-governor of Hong Kong, Reginald Edward Stubbs, to present the salamander to the Zoological Society of London. Upon receiving the individual, Boulenger found it to be physically distinct from "Megalobatrachus maximus" (the former species into which his father, Belgian-British zoologist George Albert Boulenger, had lumped both the Japanese giant salamander and Chinese giant salamander), and it thus likely represented a new species. During Edward Boulenger's description, he named the species Megalobatrachus sligoi in honor of Browne's title.

== Taxonomy ==
Despite Edward Boulenger's classification, the species Megalobatrachus sligoi was later synonymized with the Chinese giant salamander (Andrias davidianus), and eventually forgotten. However, a study published in 2018 found that the Chinese giant salamander actually consisted of numerous clades restricted to different river basins, with many of them being distinct enough to be considered separate species. One of these clades was the unnamed Clade D, sister to the unnamed Clade U1. A 2019 study of museum specimens found that the South Chinese population of A. davidianus was referable to Clade D, likely represented a distinct species, and was the subject of Edward Boulenger's original description, and thus supported the revival of Andrias sligoi as a distinct species.

== Description ==
It is possible that Andrias sligoi may be the largest extant amphibian today, a superlative generally attributed to Andrias davidianus. The largest known Andrias specimen was a 1.8 m (5.9 ft) individual captured near Guiyang in Guizhou Province in the early 1920s. Although historical specimens collected near Guizhou do not have enough usable DNA to identify the species they belong to, more recent specimens collected from the region cluster with A. sligoi, meaning that the largest collected individual may have been an A. sligoi, rather than A. davidianus or a related species.

When describing the species, Edward Boulenger referenced notable morphological differences between "M." sligoi and "Megalobatrachus maximus " (A. davidianus), which were later also used to support its revival as a distinct species. However, living captive individuals discovered in Japan in 2024 were found to very closely resemble A. davidianus and Andrias jiangxiensis despite genetically matching with A. sligoi, indicating that Boulenger's morphological diagnosis may have been inaccurate. At the time, "Megalobatrachus maximus" referred to both the Chinese and Japanese giant salamanders, so it is possible that Boulenger may have compared A. sligoi with an individual of A. japonicus to find these morphological differences, as opposed to A. davidianus.

== Threats and conservation ==
The South China giant salamander is highly endangered by overharvesting due to its status as a delicacy and use in traditional Chinese medicine, and it is unknown if any wild populations survive today. A large commercial trade in the species and its relatives was already established by the late 20th century, and very large-scale farms now exist for breeding giant salamanders for food and medicinal purposes. Several specimens collected in the 1990s originate from outside the native range of the species, and likely represent either translocated individuals that escaped the trade or individuals donated by or purchased from traders. Indiscriminate farming may also promote hybridization between different species, further contaminating each species' gene pool. For this reason, it has been proposed that Andrias sligoi be classified as Critically Endangered on the IUCN Red List. Proposed conservation actions include creating a separate management plan for A. sligoi, identifying and protecting sites that remnant wild populations may possibly occur at, identifying captive individuals and preventing hybridization or translocation, and creating a genetically pure founder population for the purpose of captive breeding and release.

A. sligoi persists on salamander farms, but the status of wild populations remains unknown. Wild populations have been discovered in Chongqing, but may represent introduced populations, as this region is otherwise inhabited by A. davidianus. Populations in Guizhou were only documented from salamander farms but were alleged to have been captured locally. In 2019, several small wild populations were rediscovered in Zhangjiajie National Forest Park in Hunan, but these populations were at dangerously low levels and reintroduction projects were likely still essential for the species. It is possible that the Hunan populations may represent a separate species sister to A. sligoi.

A 2024 study reported that at least 4 captive individuals of A. sligoi were known from Japan, with two still alive at Sunshine Aquarium and Hiroshima City Asa Zoological Park, while another from Himeji City Aquarium and another in private hands died prior to the study's publishing. Some of these individuals may be surviving members of a group of over 800 salamanders (including at least A. sligoi and A. davidianus) that were imported from China in 1972 and kept in an artificial pond in Okayama Prefecture, with over 300 dying within one year of captivity. As these individuals were imported before the start of captive breeding in China, they likely represent genetically pure wild-caught individuals. The surviving individuals are both males and nearing the end of their natural lifespans.
