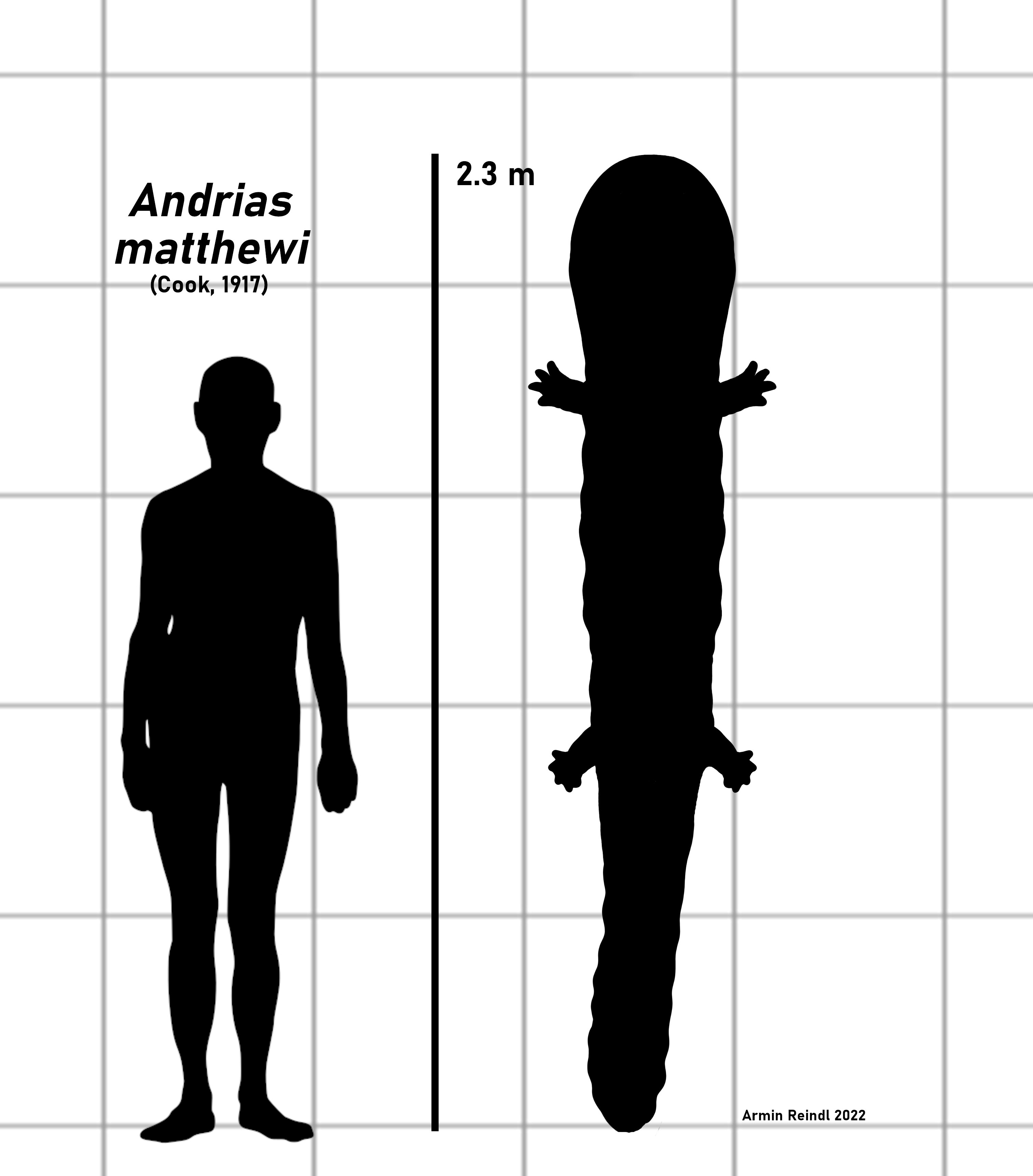
- Size comparison between a human and A. matthewi

Scientific classification
- Domain: Eukaryota
- Kingdom: Animalia
- Phylum: Chordata
- Class: Amphibia
- Order: Urodela
- Family: Cryptobranchidae
- Genus: Andrias
- Species: †A. matthewi

Binomial name
- †Andrias matthewi (Cook, 1917)

Synonyms
- Plicagnathus matthewi Cook, 1917; Cryptobranchus matthewi (Cook, 1917); Cryptobranchus mccalli Tihen & Chantell, 1963

= Andrias matthewi =

Andrias matthewi Temporal range: Arikareean–Barstovian

Extinct species of amphibian

Andrias matthewi, or Matthew's giant salamander, is an extinct species of giant salamander from the Miocene of North America. It belongs to the genus Andrias, which contains the living Asian giant salamanders. It is the largest salamander known to have ever existed, with a maximum estimated length of 2.3 m (7 ft 7 in). Its fossils have been found in Nebraska, Colorado, and Saskatchewan.

== Taxonomy ==
In 1917, Harold Cook named the new genus and species Plicagnathus matthewi for a dentary from Nebraska, specifically from the unit known as the "lower Snake Creek beds", which was later renamed as the Olcott Formation. The species was named in honor of William Diller Matthew, who first identified the specimen. In 1963, Joseph Tihen and Charles Chantell named the new species Cryptobranchus mccalli for two maxillae from the Valentine Formation of Nebraska. Charles Meszoely synonymized C. mccalli with P. matthewi and Plicagnathus with Andrias in 1966, leading to the current name Andrias matthewi. Bruce Naylor synonymized Andrias with Cryptobranchus in 1981, resulting in the combination Cryptobranchus matthewi, but this was not accepted by subsequent authors.

== Size ==
Cook estimated a length of 1.52 m (5 ft 0 in) based on the holotype dentary. Meszoely estimated lengths of 1.5 m (4 ft 11 in) and 1.8 m (5 ft 11 in) from a referred maxilla and dentary, respectively, from the Marsland Formation of Nebraska. Naylor estimated a length of 2.3 m (7 ft 7 in) using two vertebrae from the Wood Mountain Formation of Saskatchewan. In comparison, the largest living salamander, the South China giant salamander (Andrias sligoi), reaches lengths of 1.75 m (5 ft 9 in).
