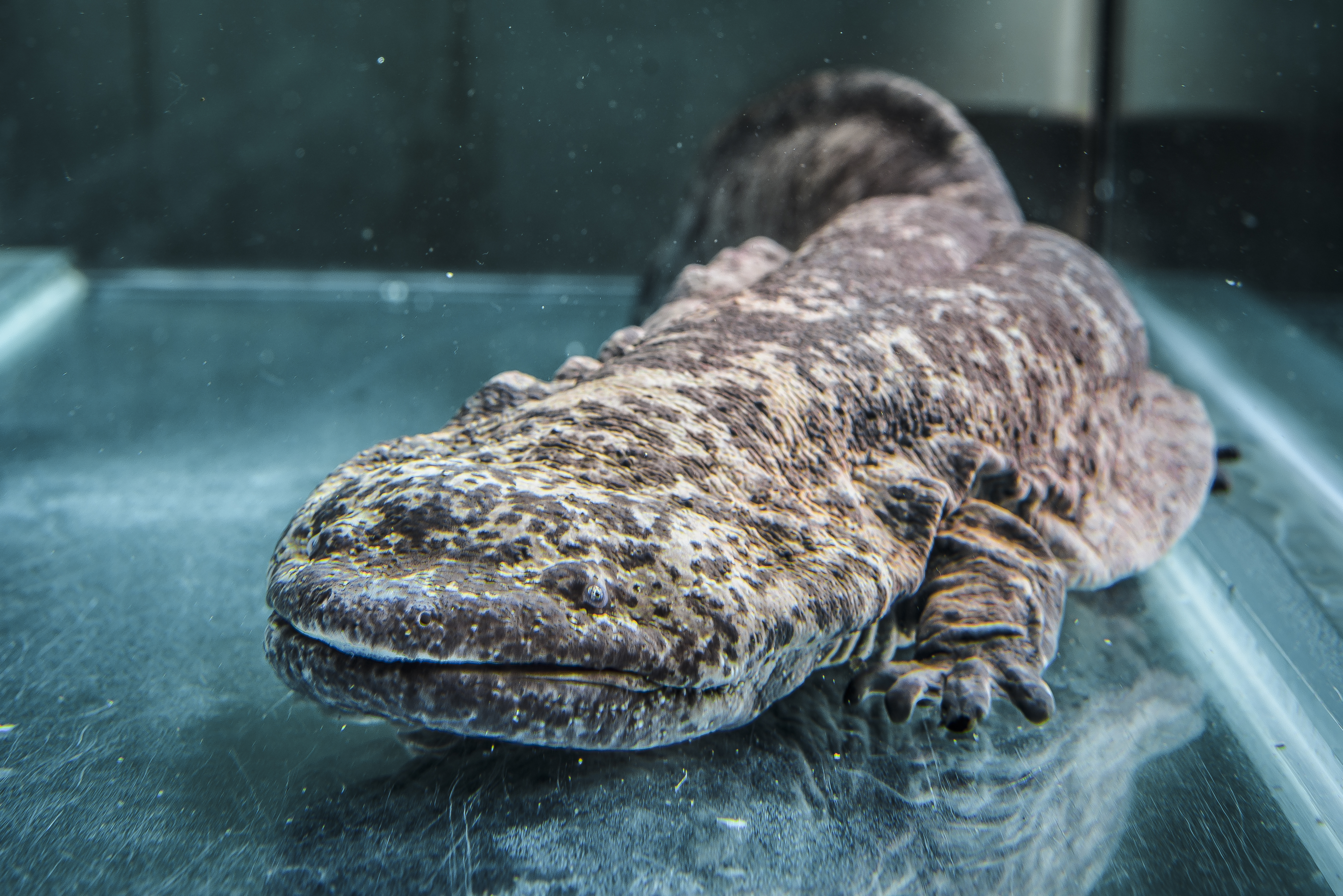

Conservation status
- Critically Endangered (IUCN 3.1)
- CITES Appendix I

Scientific classification
- Kingdom: Animalia
- Phylum: Chordata
- Class: Amphibia
- Order: Urodela
- Family: Cryptobranchidae
- Genus: Andrias
- Species: A. davidianus

Binomial name
- Andrias davidianus (Blanchard, 1871)
- Approximate distribution Species range

Synonyms
- Megalobatrachus davidianus (Reviewed by Liu, 1950)

= Chinese giant salamander =

Species of amphibian

Chinese giant salamander
- Traditional Chinese: 大鯢
- Simplified Chinese: 大鲵
Transcriptions
Standard Mandarin
- Hanyu Pinyin: Dàní
- IPA: [tâ.nǐ]
Yue: Cantonese
- Yale Romanization: Daai^{6}-ngai^{4}
- Jyutping: Daaih-ngàih
- IPA: [taj˨.ŋɐj˩]
Southern Min
- Tâi-lô: Tuā-ngé

Alternative Chinese name
- Traditional Chinese: 娃娃魚
- Simplified Chinese: 娃娃鱼
- Literal meaning: "baby fish"
Transcriptions
Standard Mandarin
- Hanyu Pinyin: Wāwā yú
Yue: Cantonese
- Yale Romanization: Wā-wā yùh
- Jyutping: Waa^{1}-waa^{1} jyu^{4}
Southern Min
- Tâi-lô: Ua-ua hî

The Chinese giant salamander (Andrias davidianus) is the largest salamander and the largest amphibian in the world. It is fully aquatic, and is endemic to rocky mountain streams and lakes in the Yangtze river basin of central China. It has also been introduced to Kyoto Prefecture in Japan, and possibly to Taiwan. It is considered critically endangered in the wild due to habitat loss, pollution, and overcollection, as it is considered a delicacy and used in traditional Chinese medicine. On farms in central China, it is extensively farmed and sometimes bred, although many of the salamanders on the farms are caught in the wild. It has been listed as one of the top-10 "focal species" in 2008 by the Evolutionarily Distinct and Globally Endangered project.

The Chinese giant salamander is considered to be a "living fossil". Although protected under Chinese law and CITES Appendix I, the wild population has declined by more than an estimated 80% since the 1950s. Although traditionally recognized as one of two living species of Andrias salamander in Asia, the other being the Japanese giant salamander, evidence indicates that the Chinese giant salamander may be composed of at least five cryptic species, further compounding each individual species' endangerment.

== Taxonomy ==
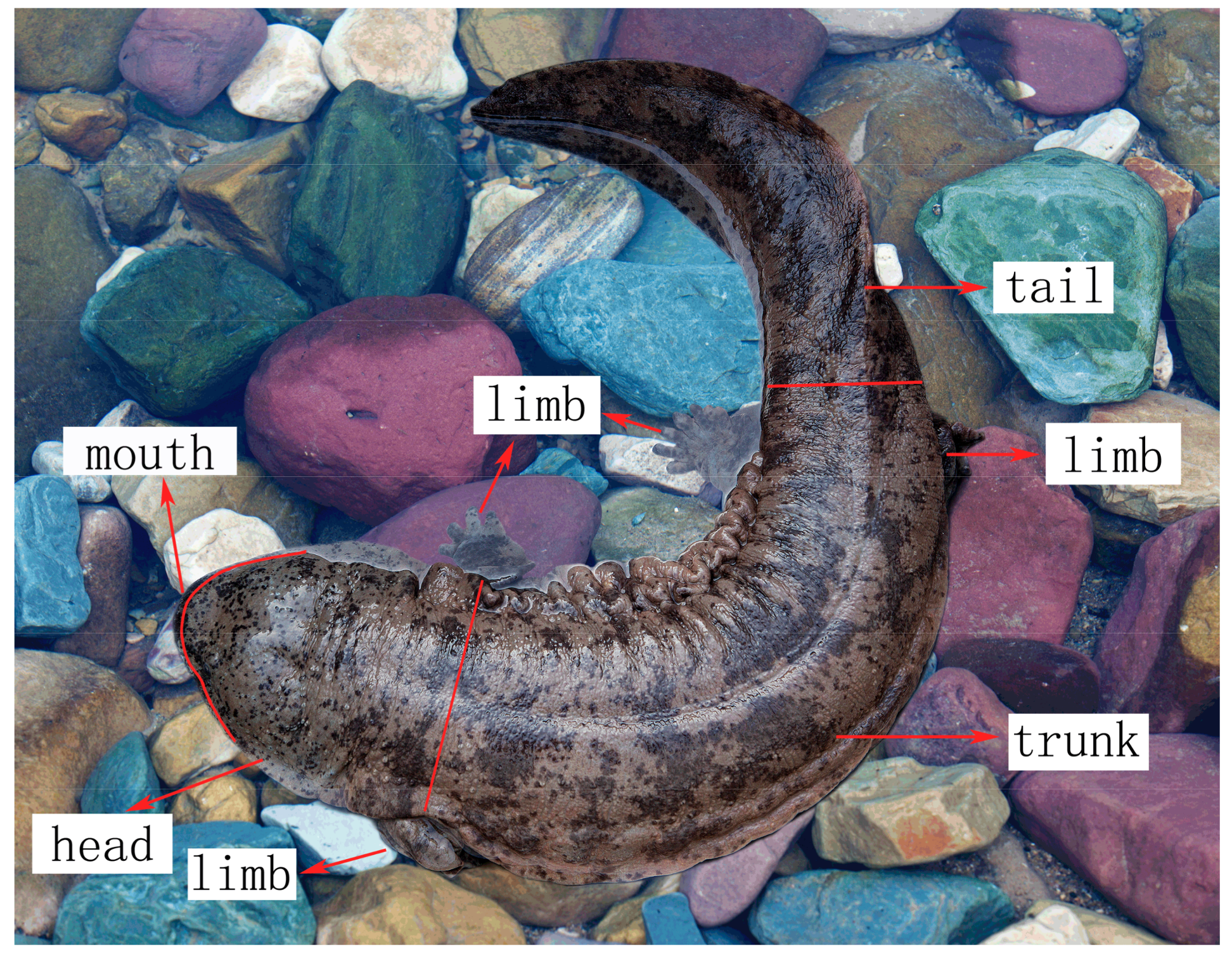
Image showing the anatomy of Chinese giant salamander

The correct scientific name of this species has been argued to be Andrias scheuchzeri (in which case Andrias davidianus would be a junior synonym) – a name otherwise restricted to an extinct species described from Swiss fossils. It has also been given the moniker of "living fossil" for being part of the family Cryptobranchidae which dates back 170 million years. It is one of only five to six known extant species of the family, the others being the slightly smaller, but otherwise very similar Japanese giant salamander (Andrias japonicus), the slightly larger South China giant salamander (A. sligoi), the Jiangxi giant salamander (Andrias jiangxiensis), the Qimen giant salamander (Andrias cheni), and the far smaller North American hellbender (Cryptobranchus alleganiensis).

A 2018 study of mitochondrial DNA revealed that there are five wild clades of the Chinese giant salamander, as well as two only known from captives (their possible wild range was previously unknown). They diverged from each other 4.71–10.25 million years ago and should possibly be recognized as cryptic species. Despite this deep divergence, they can hybridize among each other, and also with the Japanese giant salamander. One of these clades was identified in 2019 as Andrias sligoi, a species described in 1924 by Edward George Boulenger and later synonymized with A. davidianus, with the study supporting its revival as a distinct taxon. Another then-undescribed species was also identified that formerly inhabited rivers originating from the Huangshan mountains in eastern China; this was described as Andrias cheni in 2023. In 2022, one of the captive-only clades was described as Andrias jiangxiensis, and was found to have maintained genetically pure wild populations in Jiangxi Province, in contrast to most of the other clades.

As of the latest 2024 study by Marr et al there are a total of 7 clades, 2 of them being undetermined with the other 5 being the Chinese giant salamander (Andrias davidianus, Clade G1), South China giant salamander (Andrias sligoi, Clade B), Jiangxi giant salamander (Andrias jiangxiensis, Clade D1), Qimen giant salamander (Andrias cheni, Clade E), and Yaoluoping giant salamander (Andrias yaoluopingensis, Clade C). The two unnamed clades (Clade F) and (Clade A) were found in the Jialing River and Xing'an County respectively. The report also identifies 2 potential subclades closely related to the Jiangxi giant salamander (D2) and Chinese giant salamander (G2) distributed around the Nanling Mountains, Guangdong and Qinling Mountains respectively.

== Description ==
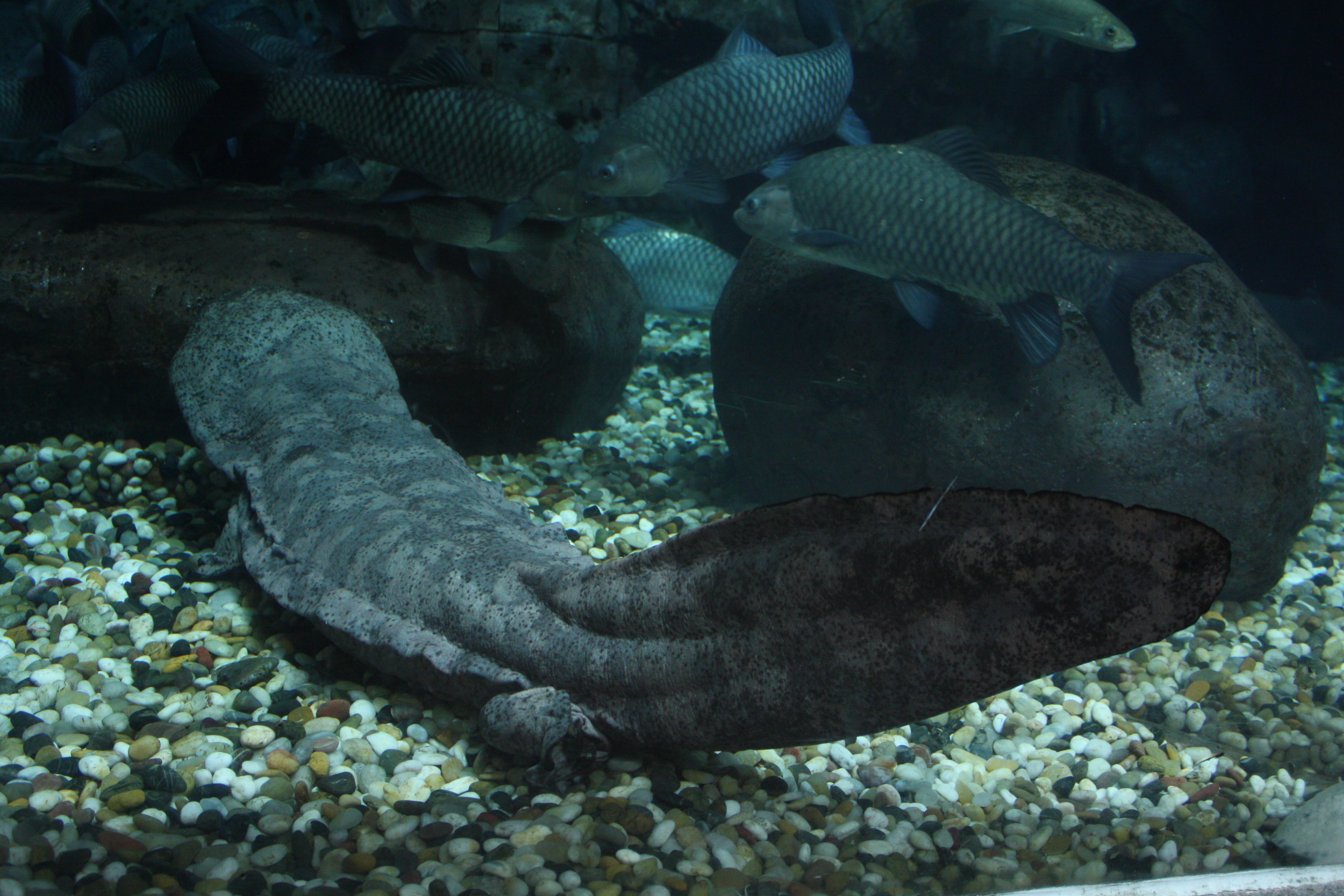
At Shanghai Ocean Aquarium

It has a large head, small eyes and dark wrinkly skin. Its flat, broad head has a wide mouth, round, lidless eyes, and a line of paired tubercles that run around its head and throat. Its color is typically dark brown with a mottled or speckled pattern, but it can also be other brownish tones, dark reddish, or black. Albinos, which are white or orange, have been recorded. All species of giant salamanders produce a sticky, white skin secretion that repels predators.

The average adult salamander weighs 25–30 kg (55–66 lb) and is 1.3 m (4.3 ft) in length. It can reach up to 50 kg (110 lb) in weight and 1.8 m (5.9 ft) in length, making it the second-largest amphibian species, after the South China giant salamander (Andrias sligoi). The longest recently documented Chinese giant salamander, kept at a farm in Zhangjiajie, was 1.8 m (5.9 ft) in 2007. At 59 kg (130 lb), both this individual, and a 1.4 m (4.6 ft) long, 52 kg (114 lb) individual found in a remote cave in Chongqing in December 2015, surpassed the species' typically reported maximum weight.

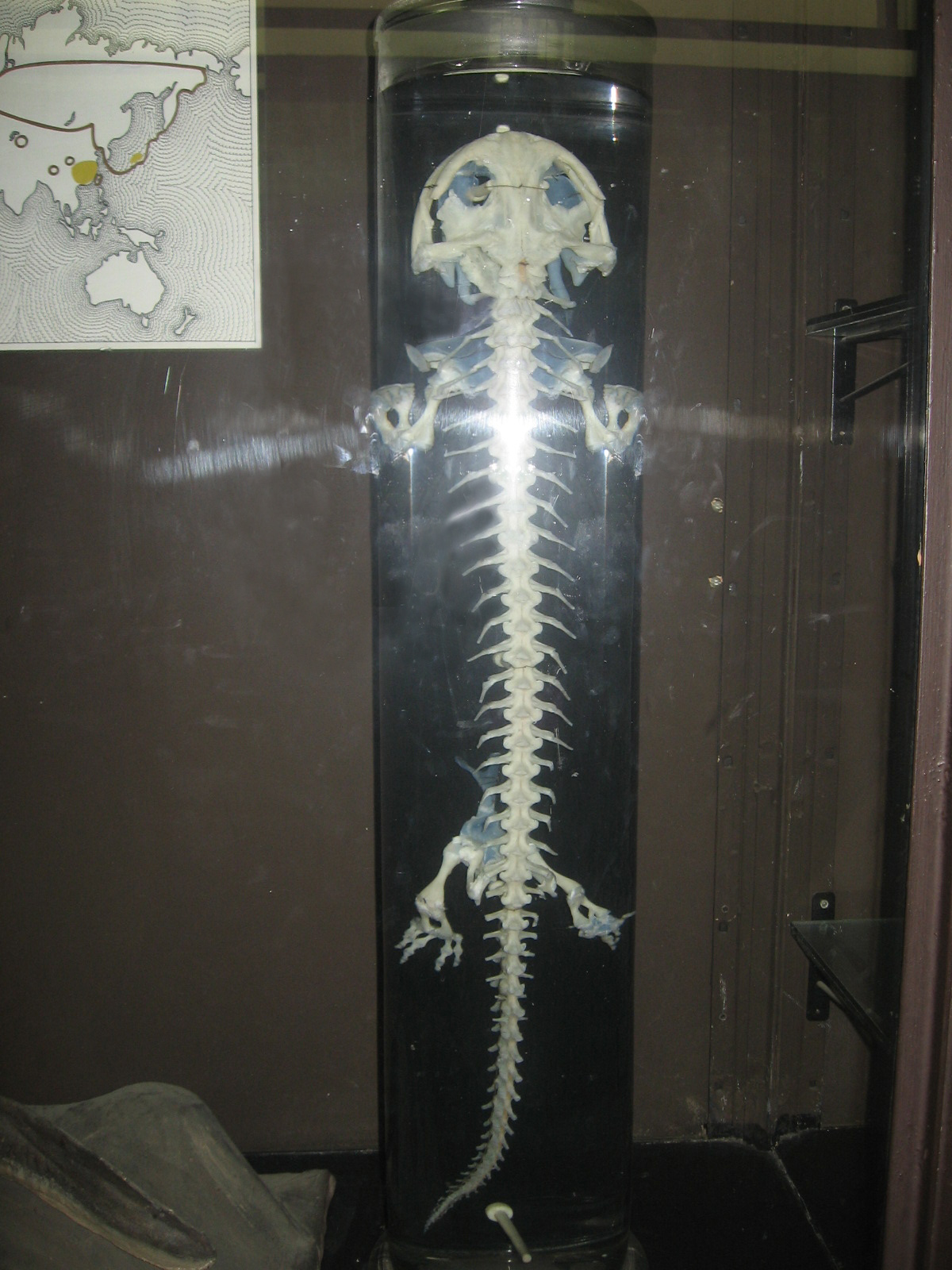
Skeleton

The giant salamander is known to vocalize, making barking, whining, hissing, or crying sounds. Some of these vocalizations bear a striking resemblance to the crying of a young human child, and as such, it is known in the Chinese language as the "infant fish" (娃娃鱼 / 鲵 - Wáwáyú/ ní).

== Behavior ==
=== Diet ===
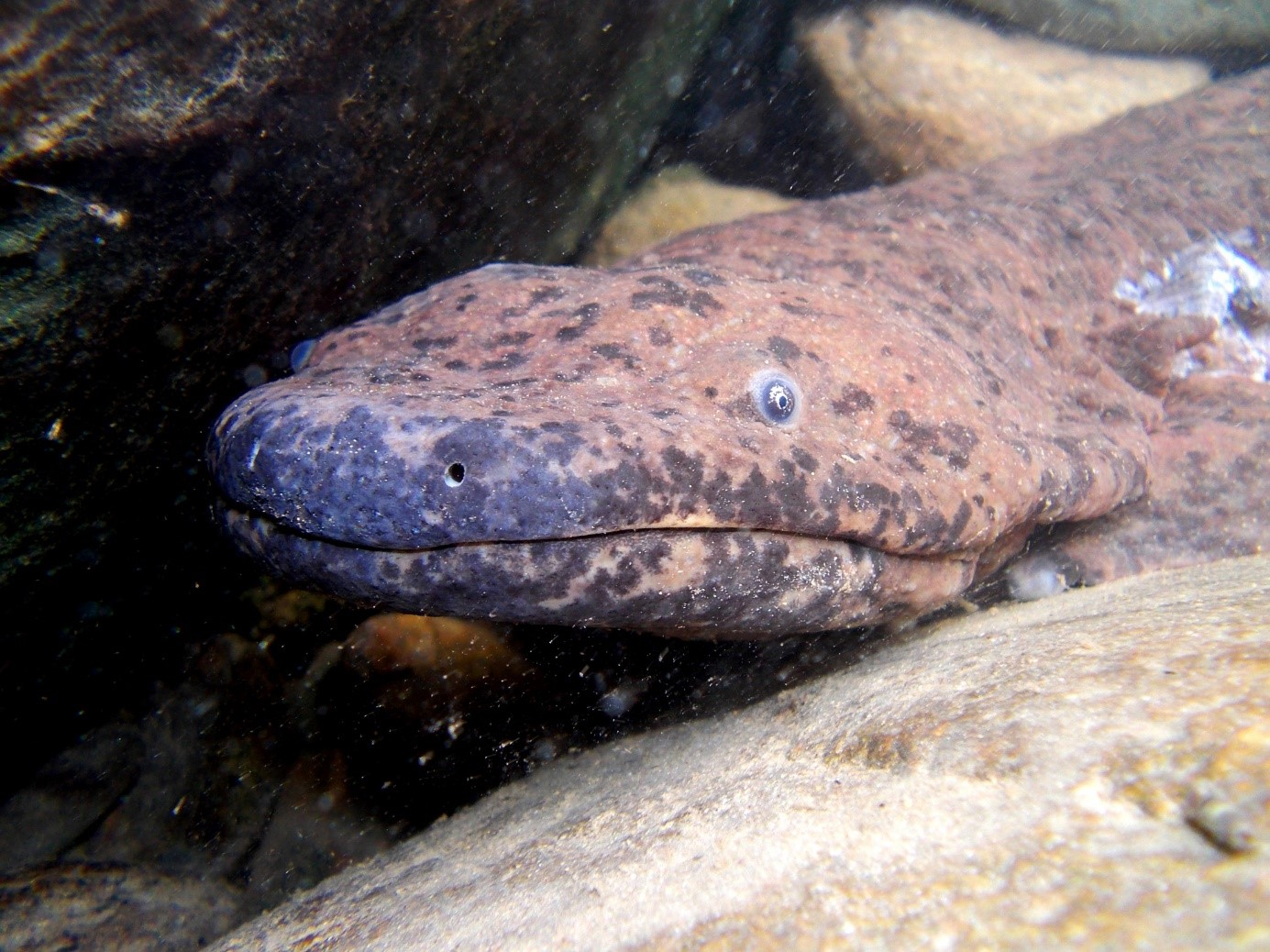
Head

The Chinese giant salamander has been recorded feeding on insects, millipedes, horsehair worms, amphibians (both frogs and salamanders), freshwater crabs, shrimp, fish (such as Saurogobio and Cobitis ), and Asiatic water shrew. Presumably ingested by mistake, plant material and gravel have also been found in their stomachs. Cannibalism is frequent; in a study of 79 specimens from the Qinling–Dabashan range, the stomach content of five included remains of other Chinese giant salamanders and this made up 28% of the combined weight of all food items in the study. The most frequent items in the same study were freshwater crabs (found in 19 specimens), which made up 23% of the combined weight of all food items.

It has very poor eyesight, so it depends on special sensory nodes that run in a line on the body from head to tail. It is capable of sensing the slightest vibrations around it with the help of these nodes. Based on a captive study, most activity is from the earlier evening to the early night. Most individuals stop feeding at water temperatures above 20 °C (68 °F) and feeding ceases almost entirely at 28 °C (82 °F). Temperatures of 35 °C (95 °F) are lethal to Chinese giant salamanders.

Adult Chinese giant salamanders and maturing Chinese giant salamanders with nonexistent or shrinking gill slits have developed a system for bidirectional flow suction feeding under water. They start by moving to their prey very slowly, then once close enough to them the Chinese giant salamander abruptly gapes its mouth open. The gaping motion of their mouth causes a great increase in the velocity of the water straight ahead of them compared to water coming in from the sides of their mouth. This is possible because of their large, wide, and flat upper and lower jaws. This process causes the prey to shoot back into their mouths as well as a copious amount of water. They then close their mouths, but leave a small gap between their upper and lower lips so that the captured water can escape.

The Chinese giant salamander catches its prey on land with an asymmetrical bite, in such a way that the force created by their jaws will be maximized in the anterior region where their prey is located. After capture they use their bite to subdue and kill their prey, both on land and in water. They are missing a bone which usually lies along the upper cheek region of most salamanders, which gives them a much stronger bite force. The bite force of the adult Chinese giant salamander is much stronger than the bite force of the maturing Chinese giant salamander due to differences in cranial structure.

Chinese giant salamanders esophaguses are made up of four different layers, one of which being a strong muscular tissue used to help move food through to the stomach. The outer most layer has ciliated cells that move mucous from mucous glands over the surface of the esophagus to lubricate it and reduce friction from large foods such as whole crabs. The ciliated structure and flexibility of the Chinese giant salamander's esophagus is hypothesized to be the reason why it is capable of swallowing such large foods.

Chinese giant salamanders are also capable of fasting for several years if they need to. This is possible because of their metabolic reserves as well as their liver, which is capable of up regulating and down regulating certain proteins according to how long they have been fasting for.

=== Breeding and lifecycle ===
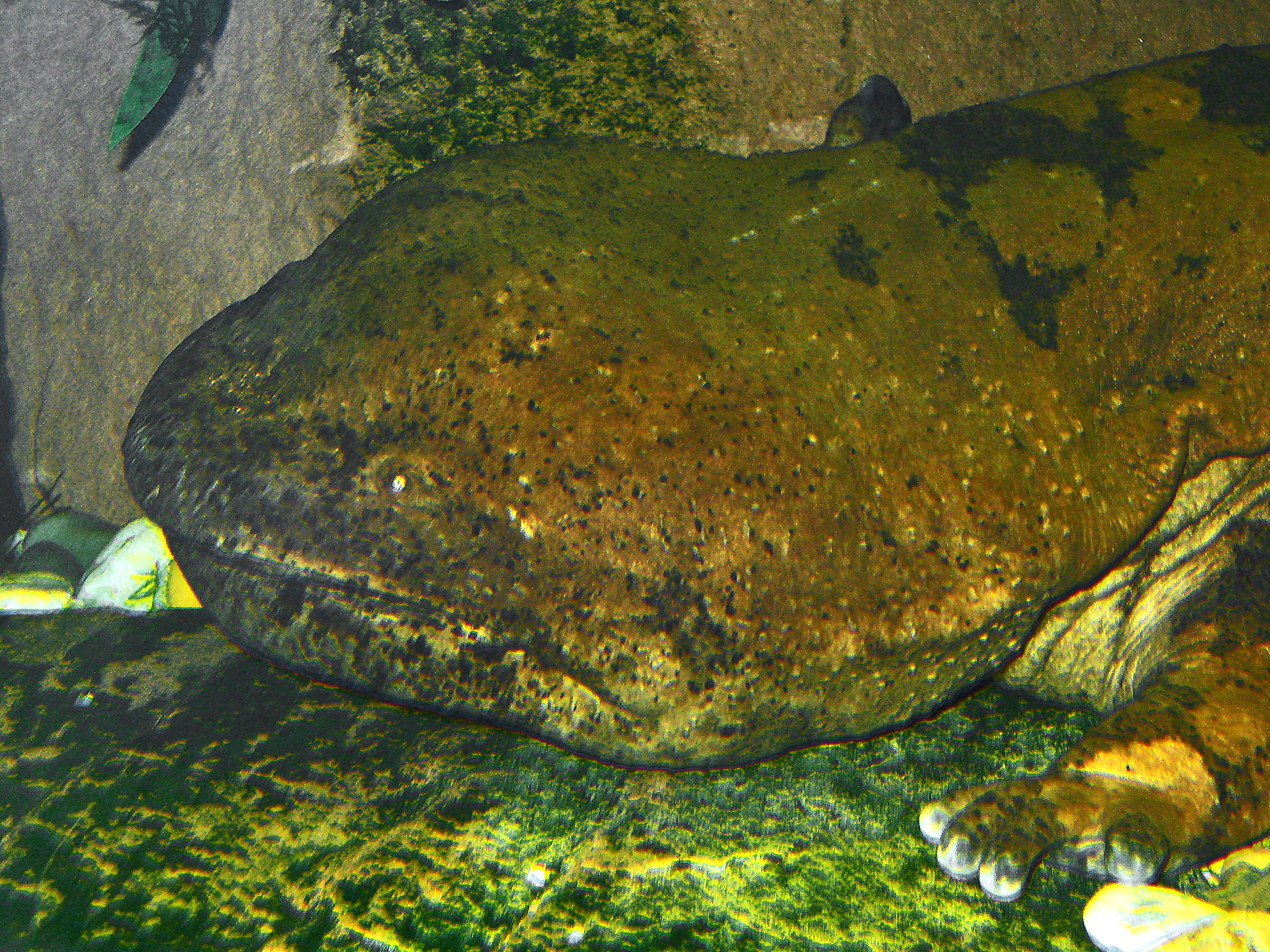
A 30-year-old giant salamander in a German zoo

Both sexes maintain a territory, averaging 40 m^{3} (1,400 ft^{3}) for males and 30 m^{3} (1,100 ft^{3}) for females. The reproductive cycle is initiated when the water temperature reaches 20 °C (68 °F) and mating occurs between July and September. The female lays 400–500 eggs in an underwater breeding cavity, which is guarded by the male until the eggs hatch after 50–60 days. They have a variety of different courtship displays including knocking bellies, leaning side-to-side, riding, mouth-to-mouth posturing, chasing, rolling over, inviting, and cohabiting. When laid, the eggs measure 7–8 mm (0.28–0.31 in) in diameter, but they increase to about double that size by absorbing water. When hatching, the larvae are about 3 cm (1.2 in) long and external gills remain until a length of about 20 cm (8 in) at an age of 3 years. The external gills start to slowly decrease in size around 9 to 16 months, the rate of this phenomenon occurs in relation to the rate of dissolved oxygen, breeding density, water temperatures, and individual differences. Maturity is reached at an age of 5 to 6 years and a length of 40–50 cm (16–20 in). The maximum age reached by Chinese giant salamanders is unknown, but it is at least 60 years based on captive individuals. Undocumented claims have been made of 200-year-old Chinese giant salamanders, but these are considered unreliable.

== Distribution and habitat ==
The Chinese giant salamander species complex comprises five clades, with multiple possibly worthy of species recognition. Their native ranges differ, but release of Chinese giant salamanders from captivity has complicated this picture. They were widespread in central, south-western, and southern China, although their range is now highly fragmented. Their range spans the area from Qinghai east to Jiangsu and south to Sichuan, Guangxi, and Guangdong; notably in the basins of the Yangtze, Yellow, and Pearl Rivers. One clade is from the Pearl River basin (at least in Guangxi), two from the Yellow River basin, one from the Yangtze River basin (at least in Chongqing and Guizhou), and the final from the Qiantang River (at least in Anhui). Two additional clades were only known from captivity (their wild range is unknown) and no samples are available for the population in the Tibetan Plateau. A 2019 study has identified that the Yangtze River clade comprises the "true" A. davidianus, the Pearl River clade comprises A. sligoi, and the Qiantang clade comprises the Huangshan Mountains species (described as A. cheni in 2023). A 2022 study identified one of the two clades known only from captivity as A. jiangxiensis, found in the wild only in Jiangxi Province.

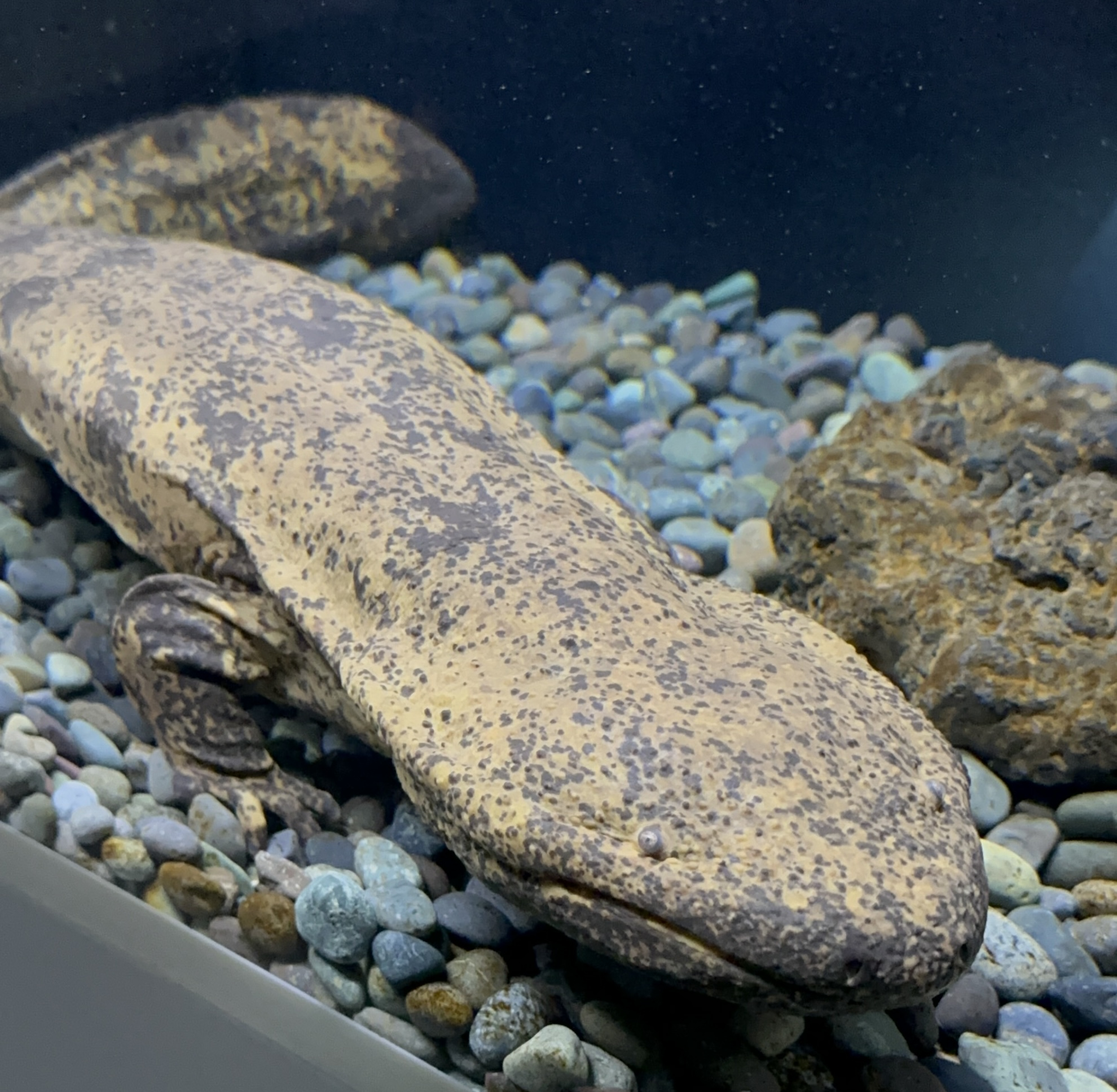
A hybrid giant salamander Andrias davidianus x japonicus from Kyoto Prefecture in captivity in AOAO Aquarium, Sapporo, Japan

Finds in Taiwan may be the result of introduction, though their exact taxonomic identity is unknown. Chinese giant salamanders have been introduced to the Kyoto Prefecture in Japan where they present a threat to the native Japanese giant salamander, as the two hybridize. A 2024 genetic study confirmed that in spite of the recent taxonomic changes within the genus, the Chinese Andrias species introduced to Japan and hybridizing with A. japonicus is the "true" A. davidianus (the Yangtze River clade, or lineage B), although at least one genetically pure individual of the captive-only lineage U1 was also detected in the wild. The Chinese giant salamander is entirely aquatic and lives in rocky hill streams and lakes with clear water. It typically lives in dark, muddy, or rocky crevices along the banks. It is usually found in forested regions at altitudes of 100 to 1,500 m (300 to 4,900 ft), with most records between 300 and 800 m (1,000 and 2,600 ft). There is an isolated population at an altitude of 4,200 m (13,800 ft) in Qinghai (Tibetan Plateau), but its taxonomic position is uncertain and the site likely does not support giant salamanders anymore due to pollution.

The salamanders prefer to live in streams of small width (on average, 6.39 m or 21 ft across), quick flow, and little depth (on average, 1.07 m or 3 ft 6 in deep). Water temperature varies depending on season, with typical range at low elevation sites being from 10 to 25 °C (50 to 77 °F) and at high elevation sites from 3 to 20 °C (37 to 68 °F). Although they prefer to have quick flow in the stream, the burrows in which they lay their eggs often have much slower flow. Furthermore, their habitat often possesses very rocky, irregular stream beds with a lot of gravel and small rocks as well as some vegetation. Chinese giant salamanders are also known from subterranean rivers. As populations in aboveground rivers and lakes are more vulnerable to poaching, there are some parts of China where only the subterranean populations remain.

== In captivity ==
=== Farming ===
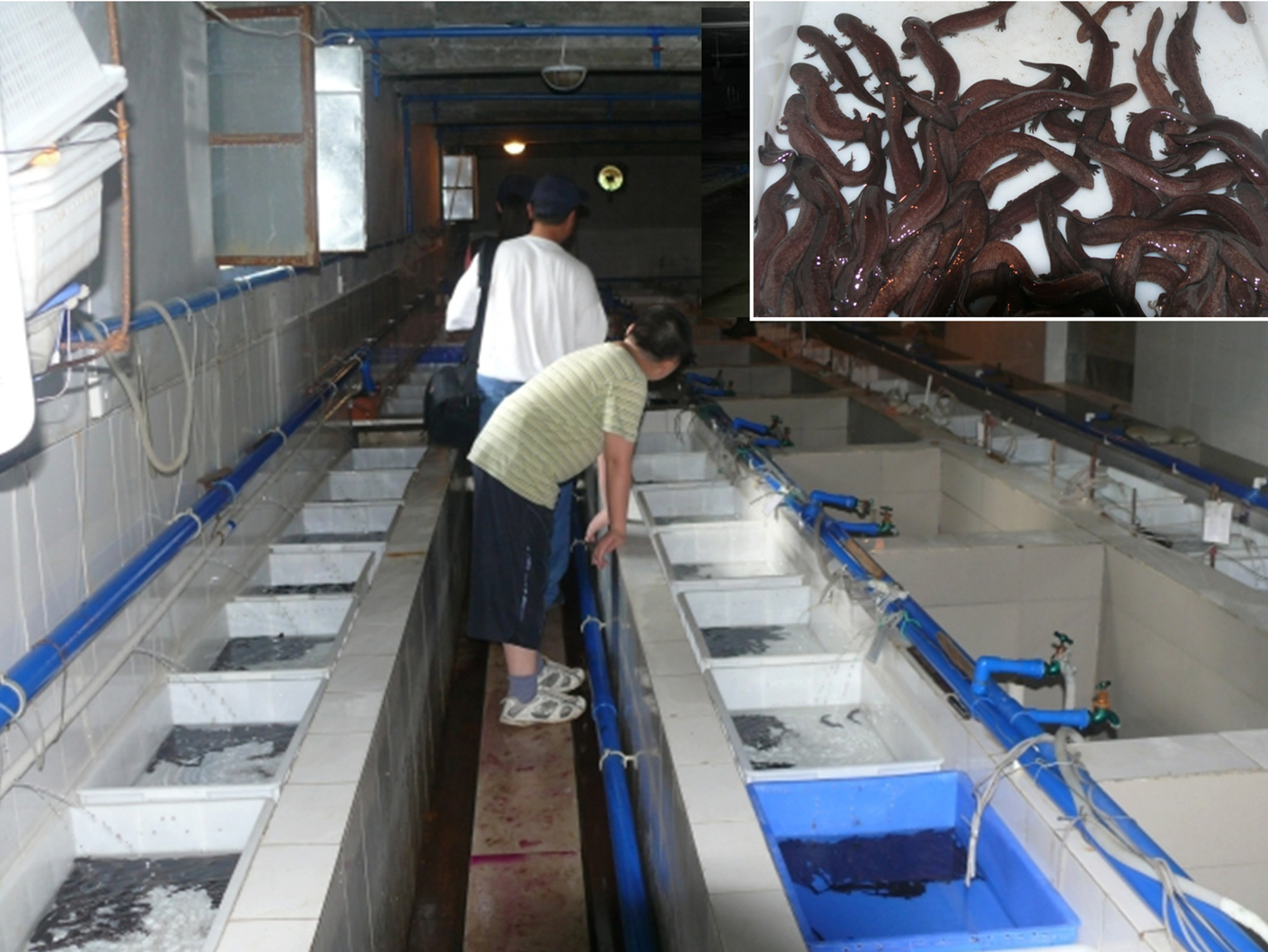
Chinese giant salamanders are bred in large numbers in Chinese farms, but the breeding stock (parents) have often been wild-caught.

Very large numbers are being farmed in China, but most of the breeding stock are either wild-caught or first-generation captive-bred. This is partially explained by the fact that the industry is relatively new, but some farms have also struggled to produce second-generation captive-bred offspring. Registrations showed that 2.6 million Chinese giant salamanders were kept in farms in 2011 in Shaanxi alone, far surpassing the entire countrywide wild population estimated at less than 50,000 individuals. Shaanxi farms (mainly in the Qinling Mountain region) accounted for about 70% of the total output in China in 2012, but there are also many farms in Guizhou and several in other provinces. Among 43 south Shaanxi farms surveyed, 38 bred the species in 2010 and each produced an average of c. 10,300 larvae that year. Farming of Chinese giant salamanders, herbs, and mushrooms are the three most important economic activities in Shaanxi's Qinling Mountain region, and many thousands of families rely on the giant salamander farms for income. The giant salamander farming mainly supplies the food market, but whether this can be achieved to an extent where the pressure on the wild populations is reduced is doubtful. Release of captive-bred Chinese giant salamanders is supported by the government (8,000 were released in Shaanxi in 2011 alone), but represent a potential risk to the remaining wild population, as diseases such as Ranavirus are known from many farms. The vast majority of the farmed Chinese giant salamanders, almost 80% based on a study published in 2018, are of Yellow River origin (the so-called haplotype B), although those from other regions also occur. Farms have generally not considered this issue when releasing giant salamanders and Yellow River animals now dominate in some regions outside their original range, further endangering the native types. Additionally, release of untreated wastewater from farms may spread diseases to wild Chinese giant salamanders.

=== In zoos and aquariums ===
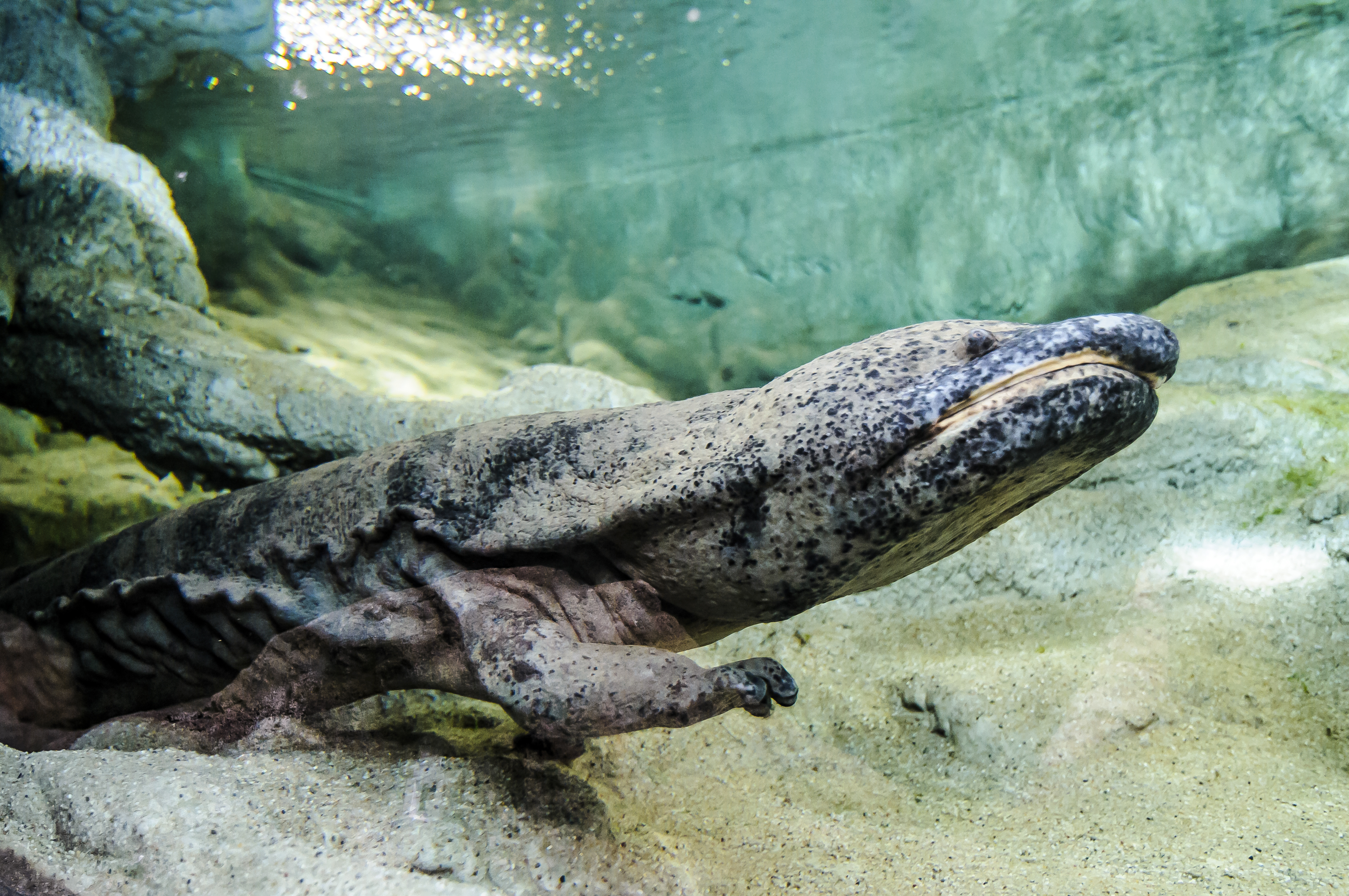
At Prague Zoo

As of early 2008, Species360 records show only five individuals held in US zoos (Zoo Atlanta, Cincinnati Zoo, and Saint Louis Zoological Park), and an additional four in European zoos (Dresden Zoo and Rotterdam Zoo); as well as one in the State Museum of Natural History Karlsruhe, where it is also the museum's mascot.

As of 2019, London Zoo holds four individuals (one of them on display) that were seized from an illegal importation of amphibians in 2016. A medium-sized individual, approximately 0.9 m (3 ft) long, was kept for several years at the Steinhart Aquarium in San Francisco, California, and is now on display again in the "Water Planet" section of the new California Academy of Sciences building. There are also two in residence at the Los Angeles Zoo. Additional individuals are likely kept in non-Species360 zoos and animals parks in its native China, such as Shanghai Zoo. Several of them are kept in the aquaria of Shanghai and Xi'an. The Osaka Aquarium Kaiyukan in Japan has both a Chinese and a Japanese giant salamander on display, as does the Saitama aquarium in Hanyū, Saitama. The Ueno Zoological Gardens also has a Chinese giant salamander on display.

Since May 2014, 33 Chinese giant salamanders, including three adults, have been held in Prague Zoo. The main attraction is the largest individual in Europe, which is 155 cm (5 ft 1 in) long.

== Decline in population ==
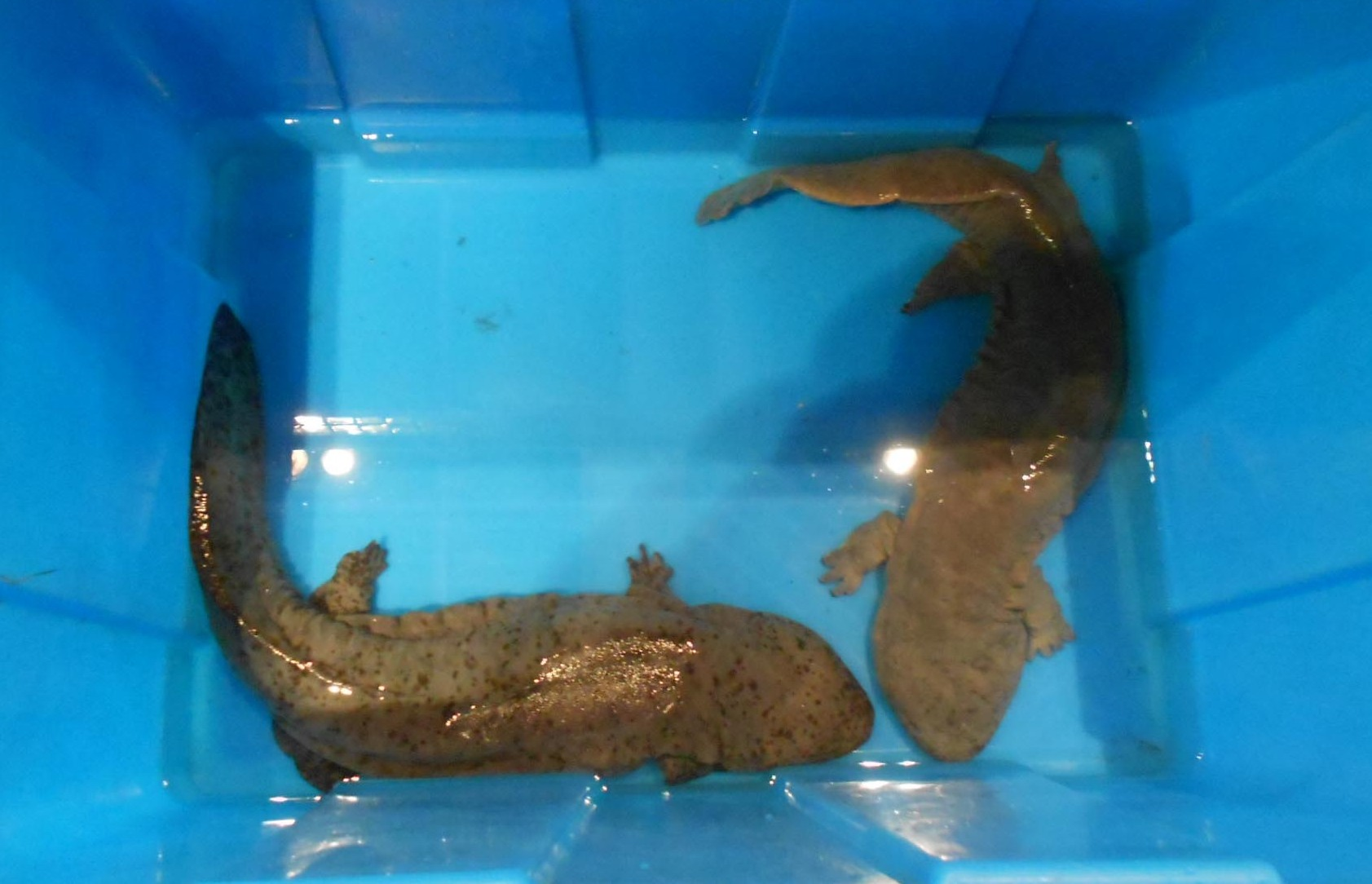
Chinese giant salamanders for sale in a restaurant in Hongqiao Town (虹桥镇) in Zhejiang, China, for 880 CNY/jin, or about 215 EUR/kg or US$127/lb. Such prices make them an attractive target for poaching.

In the past, the Chinese giant salamander was fairly common and widespread in China. Since the 1950s, the population has declined rapidly due to habitat destruction and overhunting. It has been listed as Critically Endangered in the Chinese Red Book of Amphibians and Reptiles. Despite the Chinese Government listing the salamander as a Class II Protected Species, 100 salamanders are hunted illegally every year in the Hupingshan Natural Nature Reserve alone. Since the 1980s, 14 nature reserves have been established as an effort to conserve the species. Despite this, the population continues to decline with the salamanders becoming increasingly difficult to find. In a recent survey of the species in the Qinghai Province, none were found indicating the population size is at a significantly low number or the species is locally extinct in the province. This is believed to be due to the increased mining in the region.

In recent years populations have also declined with an epizootic Ranavirus infection. The disease causes severe hemorrhaging in both juveniles and adult salamanders. The virus was named the Chinese giant salamander iridovirus (GSIV).

Its natural range has suffered in the past few decades due to habitat loss and overharvesting. Consequently, many salamanders are now farmed in mesocosms across China. Furthermore, previously built concrete dams that destroyed the salamander's habitat are now fitted with stairs so that the animal can easily navigate the dam and make it back to its niche.

The Chinese giant salamander is listed as a critically endangered species. It has experienced a drastic population decline, which is estimated to be more than 80% in the last 3 generations and due to human causes. Human consumption is the main threat to the Chinese giant salamander. They are considered to be a luxury food item and source of traditional medicines in China.

=== Habitat destruction ===
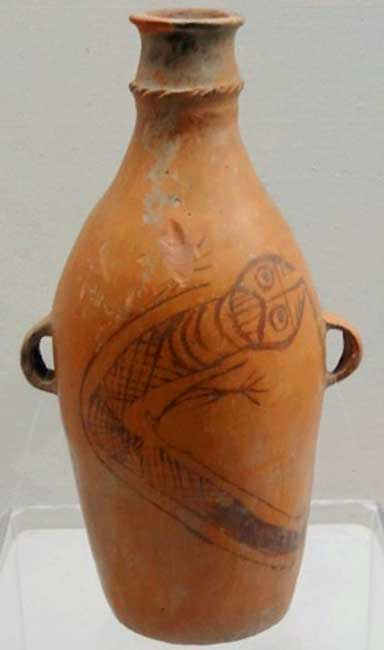
Neolithic vessel depicting a Chinese giant salamander, Yangshao culture, circa 3200 BC

According to a recent study, 90% of the Chinese giant salamanders' habitat was destroyed by the year 2000, and there are many human-related causes of such massive destruction. Because the salamander dwells in free-flowing streams, industrialization is a large problem for many stream-dwelling species. The construction of dams greatly disturbs their habitat by either causing these streams to dry up or to stand still, thus making it uninhabitable by the salamanders. Siltation also contributes to the degradation of their habitats by soiling the water. Deforestation in areas near the streams can worsen soil erosion and create runoff into the streams as well, which reduces the water quality to a great extent. The reduced water quality makes it much more difficult for the salamanders to absorb oxygen through their skin and can often bring death to those within the species.

Water pollution is also a great factor in the habitat destruction of the Chinese giant salamander; the immense decline in their population can be traced to, among the other major problems of over-hunting and failed conservation efforts, the tainting of the water that they live in. Mining activity in particular in areas near their streams often causes runoff that sullies the water, and farming—and all of the pesticides and chemicals that affect the soil that come with it—has a vastly negative effect on the areas near the streams as well. The presence of macronutrients in the streams can also cause algal blooms, which cloud the water and force the temperature to rise. The salamanders reside primarily in very cold underwater cavities and follow a specific nesting requirement, which means that they will only reproduce and care for their eggs in areas such as these, so changes in temperature are incredibly detrimental to their health and well-being as well as to their perpetuation as a species. These algal blooms also deplete the levels of oxygen in the water, and a lesser supply of oxygen can quite easily hold the potential to kill off many members of the dwindling species.

Many efforts have been undertaken to create reserves and faux habitats for the Chinese giant salamander so that they can reproduce without worry of soiled water, but many of these reserves have failed in having a great impact overall due to the massive overhunting of the species. No matter how many members of the species they manage to save through the reserves, the poachers still manage to capture and kill that many more. Although habitat destruction is certainly not assisting in the perpetuation of the species, it is certainly not the biggest obstacle that the Chinese giant salamander faces in its quest to avoid extinction.

=== Climate change ===
Like other amphibians, the Chinese giant salamander is ectothermic. Most Chinese giant salamanders stop feeding at water temperatures above 20 °C (68 °F) and feeding ceases almost entirely at 28 °C (82 °F). Temperatures of 35 °C (95 °F) are lethal to Chinese giant salamanders. As a consequence, the species is vulnerable to global warming.

=== Overhunting ===
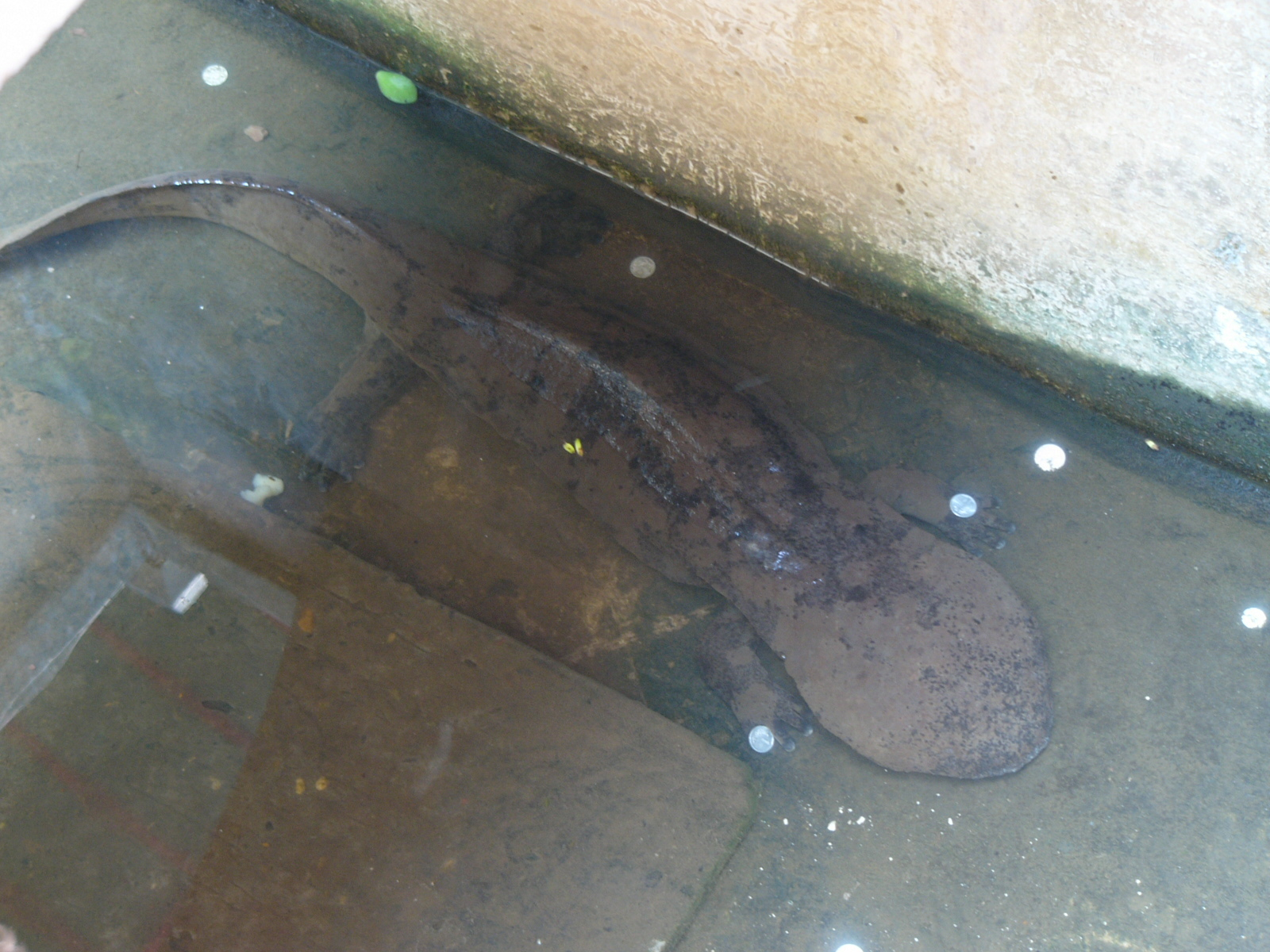

One of the main reasons that the Chinese giant salamander, Andrias davidianus, has been placed on the critically endangered list by the International Union for Conservation of Nature is overhunting. 75% of native species in China are harvested for food. The salamander is also used for traditional medicinal purposes. In 1989, the Chinese government placed legal protection on the salamander (category II due to its population decline by The Wild Animal Protection Law of China and Appendix I in the Convention of Endangered Species of Wild Fauna.).

But the salamander populations have continued to decline. The domestic demand for salamander meat and body parts greatly exceeds what can sustainably be harvested from the wild. Commercial captive breeding operations so far still rely on the regular introduction of new wild-caught breeding adults, because captive-bred animals have proven difficult to mate. In addition, salamander farms would need to increase their yield manifold before the black-market price of poached salamander drop significantly, meaning that a stricter enforcement of anti-poaching law is still very much the future for the Chinese giant salamander.

China's penalty for illegally hunting these creatures is very low and only comes to 50 yuan, or about US$6, which is less than one hundred times the black-market price. Establishments such as restaurants can charge up to US$250–400 per kilogram.

A hunting tool known as a bow hook is one of the preferred methods used by hunters to catch the salamander. This hunting tool is made with a combination of bamboo and sharp hooks baited with frogs or smaller fish. This is used to capture the salamander and keep it alive. Some hunters use pesticides to kill the salamander. Farmers often poach wild salamanders to stock their breeding programs, while others are hunted as food.

In a 2018 study, the Zoological Society of London and the Kunming Institute of Zoology in China reported on their surveys for giant salamanders in 16 Chinese provinces over four years. The researchers had been unable to confirm survival of wild salamanders at any of the 97 sites they surveyed. The study also brought up worries that commercial farms and conservation programs were crossbreeding what they described as five distinct species of Chinese giant salamanders. All the wild populations studied were found "critically depleted or extirpated" by the study. A related study found that some of the five distinct genetic lineages were probably already extinct in the wild. However, the exhaustiveness of these surveys was questioned in a 2022 study by Chai et al., who noted that over a third of the surveys had been performed only in Guizhou Province, and another third of the surveys had been performed in provinces that were only selected by habitat suitability modeling and had no actual historic records of giant salamanders. Based on this, the extent of extirpation of Chinese Andrias remains uncertain, especially as a natural population of Andrias jiangxiensis was discovered during the Chai et al. study.
