= Qimen giant salamander =

Scientific classification
- Kingdom: Animalia
- Phylum: Chordata
- Class: Amphibia
- Order: Urodela
- Family: Cryptobranchidae
- Genus: Andrias
- Species: A. cheni

Binomial name
- Andrias cheni Xu, Gong, Li, Jiang, Huang, and Huang, 2023

Species of salamander

The Qimen giant salamander (Andrias cheni) is a species of giant salamander in the family Cryptobranchidae. It is endemic to Anhui Province, China, where it inhabits streams and caves in the Huangshan Mountains. The species name honors Pihui Chen, a herpetologist at Anhui Normal University. The common name references its type locality in Qimen County.

As with all other Chinese species of the genus Andrias, it was formerly lumped into Andrias davidianus, but its heavy genetic divergence from other members of the genus was known as early as 2001. It was also identified as a distinct lineage in a 2018 study by Yan et al., who identified at least seven highly endangered cryptic lineages, none of which were known to have wild populations and all of which are affected by extensive hybridization in captivity. One such lineage was "Clade E", identified from wild specimens caught before 1995 from the Huangshan Mountains. "Clade E" was confirmed as representing a distinct, undescribed species in a study the following year, and was finally described as such in 2023.

Unlike other Chinese giant salamander species, Andrias cheni was not extensively poached until recently, as it was previously avoided by local people due to its "ugly" appearance. However, the illegal trade in the species soared since the mid-1990s, and the wild population is now considered critically endangered. Recent surveys were unsuccessful at finding any wild populations. However, some genetically pure captive individuals are known in local breeding farms, which may prove essential in restoring wild populations.
