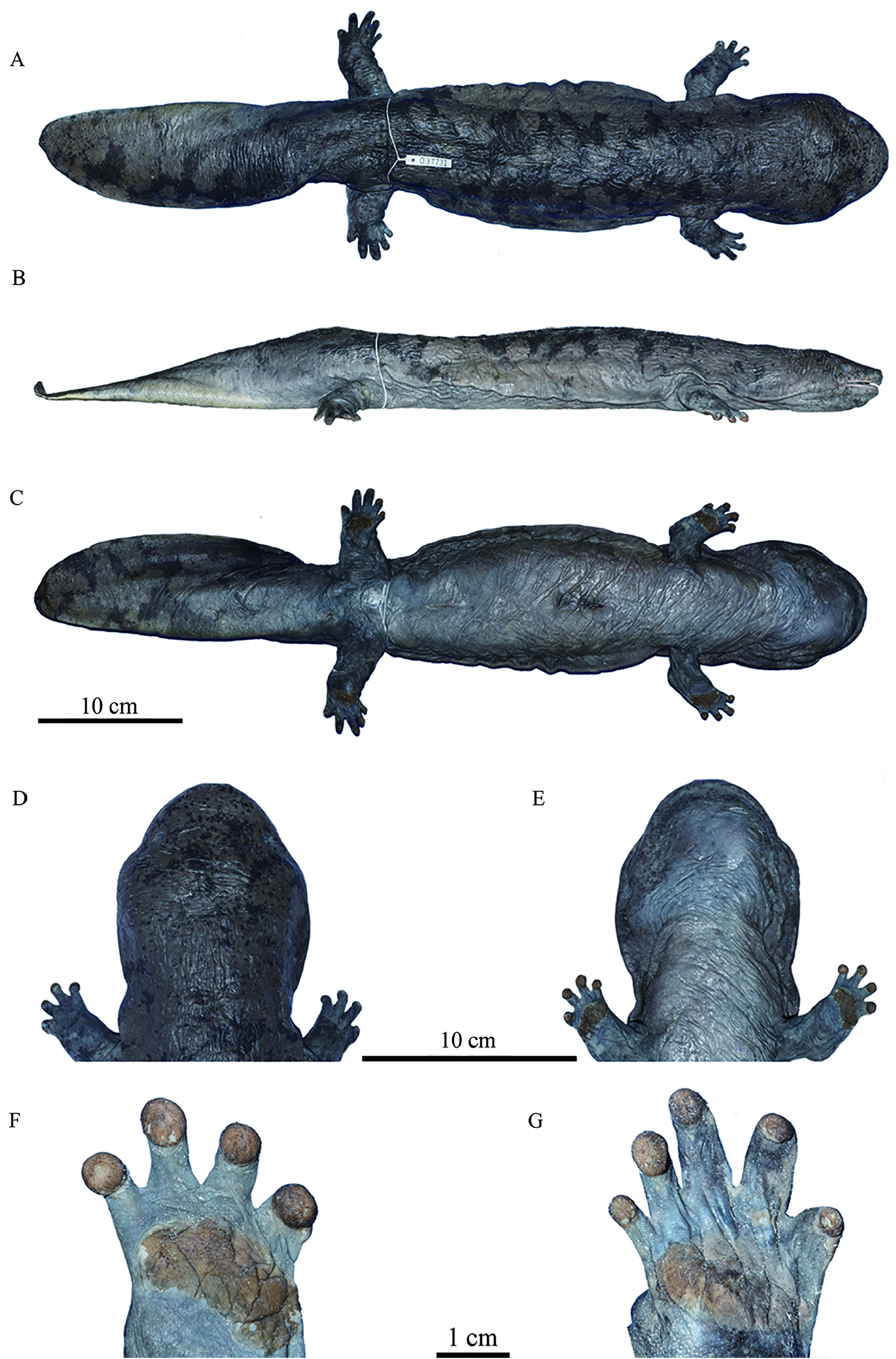

Scientific classification
- Kingdom: Animalia
- Phylum: Chordata
- Class: Amphibia
- Order: Urodela
- Family: Cryptobranchidae
- Genus: Andrias
- Species: A. jiangxiensis

Binomial name
- Andrias jiangxiensis Lu et al, 2022

= Jiangxi giant salamander =

Species of amphibian

The Jiangxi giant salamander (Andrias jiangxiensis) is a species of very large salamander endemic to Jiangxi Province in China. It is the only Chinese Andrias species known to have a genetically pure wild population.

== Discovery and description ==
Prior to 2018, all giant salamanders in China were thought to belong to a single species: the Chinese giant salamander (A. davidianus), the largest known amphibian species. However, a major genetic study that year found deep divergences between lineages of the Chinese giant salamander, with many genetically distinct clades restricted to different river basins, and thus proposed it to be a species complex comprising at least 5 different species. In addition, none of these species were known to have native wild populations, with most wild individuals being releases from salamander breeding farms and belonging to multiple different lineages or hybrids between them. One of the lineages identified in the study was named clade U2, but its exact geographic origin remained uncertain due to the only specimens being of farm-bred individuals.

Despite the 2018 study finding no evidence of wild Chinese giant salamander populations, other researchers found these assessments to be biased, with much of the survey effort being targeted within either a single county (Guizhou) or in regions that were predicted to have suitable habitat but had no historic records of giant salamanders. For this reason, targeted surveys involving closed nature reserves (national nature reserves inaccessible to the public) were taken from 2020 to 2022. This led to the discovery of a breeding population of giant salamanders in the Jiulingshan National Nature Reserve in Jing'an County, Jiangxi Province. Genetic analysis of this population found it to be genetically pure with no evidence of intermixing with translocated individuals, and also found them to match with the U2 clade identified in previous studies. This lineage was thus described as a distinct species, Andrias jiangxiensis.

== Taxonomy ==
A. jiangxiensis is the second-most basal known member of the Chinese Andrias lineages, with only the unnamed Clade E being more basal (although the 2018 study instead found both to be sister groups to one another). It is thought to be the sister group to all other identified Chinese Andrias lineages, including A. davidianus, A. sligoi, and several undescribed species. A. jiangxiensis and its sister group are thought to have split from Clade E during the early Pliocene, about 4.95 million years ago.

== Distribution ==
The Jiangxi giant salamander is thought to be restricted to Jiangxi Province in China. It is known to have been densely distributed around two towns in Jing'an County prior to the 1990s, but by 2020, wild populations were only known from Jiulingshan National Nature Reserve.

== Description ==
A. jiangxiensis differs from the three previously described Chinese and Japanese Andrias species by having a smooth head with indistinct tubercules.

== Status ==
Due to its very small distribution that is vulnerable to environmental changes, it has been recommended that this species be classified as critically endangered on the IUCN Red List. In contrast to many other regions of China, giant salamanders are not regularly consumed around the range of A. jiangxiensis, and they are viewed significantly more positively compared to the negative views seen in other regions. Two small-scale farms are known near the wild range of this species, but A. jiangxiensis is the only species bred in them, as their owners refused to farm other species of giant salamander aside from the local one.
