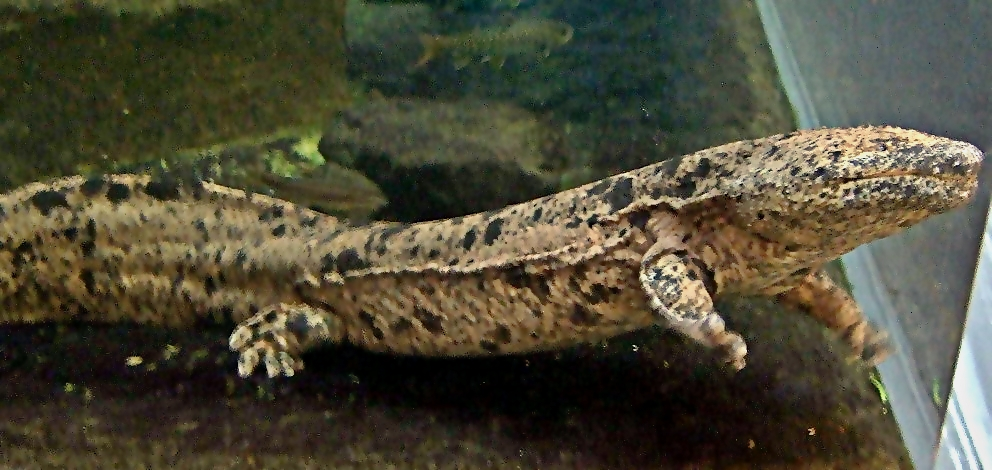
- Andrias japonicus
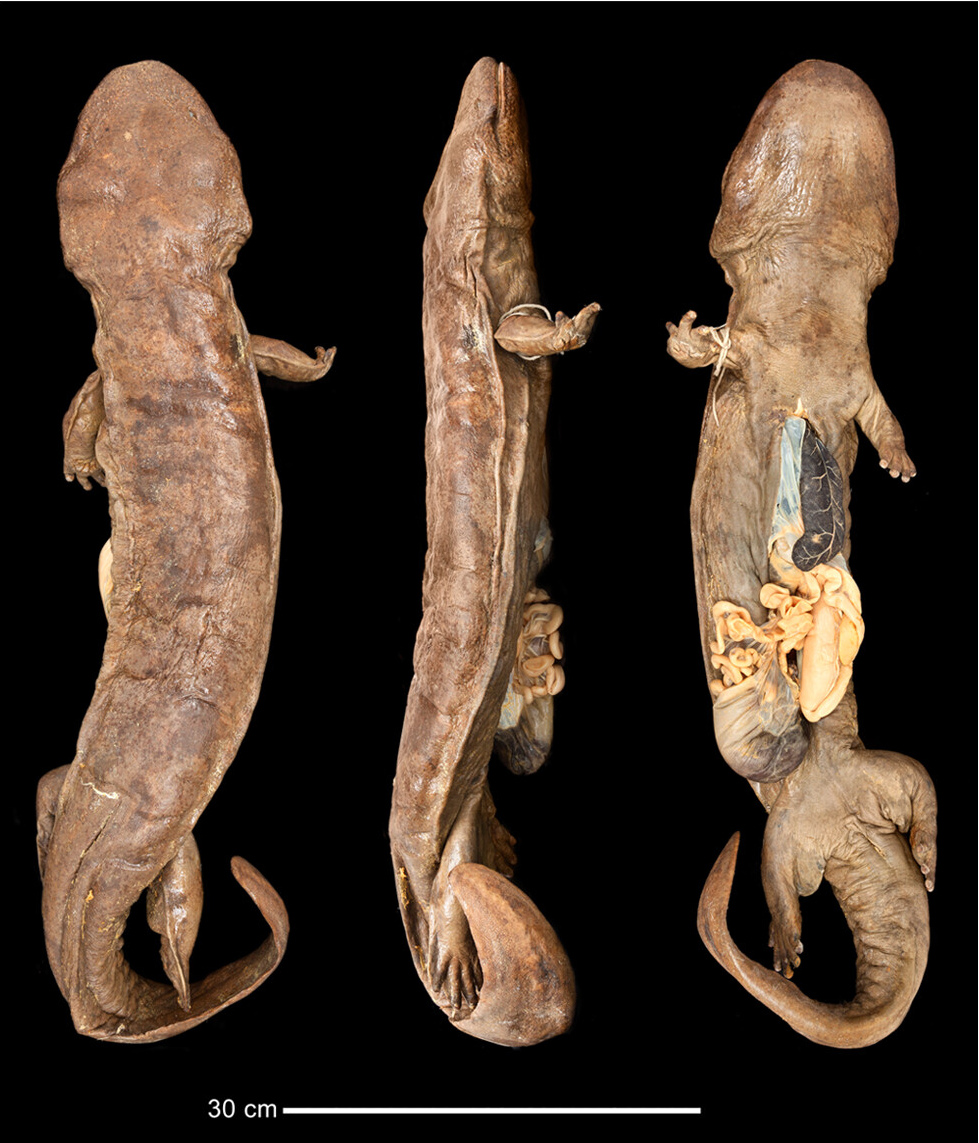
- Andrias sligoi

Scientific classification
- Kingdom: Animalia
- Phylum: Chordata
- Class: Amphibia
- Order: Urodela
- Family: Cryptobranchidae
- Genus: Andrias; Tschudi, 1837

Type species
- Andrias japonicus Temminck, 1836

Species
- 8 (including 2 extinct), see text

Synonyms
- Megalobatrachus

= Andrias =

Andrias Temporal range: Chattian–recent

Genus of salamanders

Andrias is a genus of giant salamanders that includes the largest extant amphibians in the world. These include species such as Andrias japonicus which can reach a length of 1.44 metres (4 ft 9 in), and Andrias sligoi which can reach a length of 1.80 metres (5 ft 11 in).

While extant species are known only from East Asia, several extinct species in the genus are known from late Oligocene and Neogene aged fossils collected in Europe and North America, indicating that the genus formerly had a much wider range.

== Taxonomy ==
The generic name derives from Ancient Greek ἀνδριάς, "statue". The former name was Megalobatrachus, from Ancient Greek meaning "giant frog".

=== Phylogeny ===
This phylogeny is based on Chai et al (2022). and Vasilyan et al (2013)

- Cryptobranchus alleganiensis
- Andrias
  - †Andrias scheuchzeri
  - - Andrias japonicus
    - - Andrias cheni
      - - Andrias jiangxiensis
        - - Andrias sp.
          - - Andrias davidianus (Andrias sp. B & C)
            - - Andrias sligoi
              - Andrias sp. "U1"

Alternative phylogeny by Fang et al (2018).

- Cryptobranchus alleganiensis
- Andrias
  - †Andrias scheuchzeri
  - - Andrias japonicus
    - - Andrias sp. "A"
      - - Andrias davidianus (Andrias sp. B & C)
        - - - Andrias sligoi
            - Andrias sp. "U1"
          - - Andrias jiangxiensis
            - Andrias cheni

== Species ==
=== Extant species ===
Image	Scientific name	Common name	Distribution
	Andrias cheni	Qimen giant salamander	Eastern China (Huangshan Mountains in Anhui Province)
	Andrias davidianus	Chinese giant salamander	Central China (traditionally considered widespread in the country, but likely restricted to Yangtze River basin), introduced to Kyoto Prefecture, Japan
	Andrias japonicus	Japanese giant salamander	Southern Japan (southern Honshu, Kyushu, and Shikoku)
	Andrias jiangxiensis	Jiangxi giant salamander	Eastern China (Jiangxi Province)
	Andrias sligoi	South China giant salamander	Southern China (Pearl River basin)
	Andrias yaoluopingensis		Yuexi and Anhui, China

Based on genetic evidence, there may be more extant species in the genus. A study in 2018 found that A. davidianus sensu lato was a species complex that consisted of at least five different species. A. sligoi, which was formerly synonymized with A. davidianus, was revived in 2019 for one of these populations. Another one of these was described as A. jiangxiensis in 2022, and another as A. cheni in 2023.

=== Fossil species ===
Image	Scientific name	Common name	Distribution	Age
	†Andrias matthewi	Matthew's giant salamander	United States and Canada	early-middle Miocene
	†Andrias scheuchzeri		Central Europe, possibly Central Asia and Western Siberia	late Oligocene-late Pliocene
