= Hiroshima City Asa Zoological Park =

Coordinates: 34.497856°N 132.44069°E

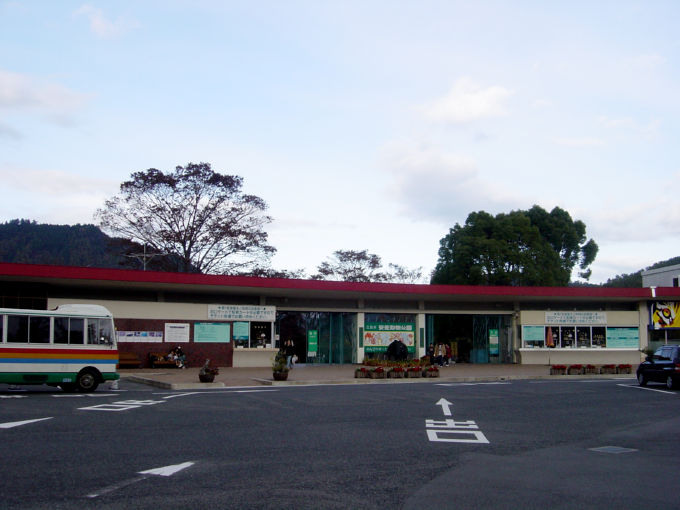
- entrance of the zoo
- Interactive map of Hiroshima City Asa Zoological Park
- Date opened: September 1, 1971
- Location: Dobutsuen, Asa-cho, Asakita-ku, Hiroshima
- No. of species: 170
- Memberships: JAZA
- Website: http://www.asazoo.jp/

Hiroshima City Asa Zoological Park (広島市安佐動物公園, Hiroshima-shi Asa Dōbutsukōen) is a zoo in Hiroshima, Japan.

== Overview ==
Asa Zoological Park opened in 1971 in Asakita-ku, Hiroshima as the 62nd zoo in Japan. The gross area of the zoo is 49.6 ha. There are about 170 species of animals in the zoo's collection, including giraffes, lions, black rhinoceroses, red pandas, brush-tailed bettongs, Japanese giant salamanders and macaws. The zoo also has African forest elephants.

The zoo recruits citizen volunteers to explain the animals in detail and with humor to visitors.

Zoo Volunteer

== History ==
The zoo opened as the 62 animal park in Japan on September 1, 1971. The zoo opened the animal contact area for kids in 2001 and the Night Safari started in the summer of 2003 which has been in operation every summer.

== See also ==
- Japanese Association of Zoos and Aquariums
