= Edward George Boulenger =

British zoologist (1888–1946)

- Born: 8 May 1888
- Died: 30 April 1946 (aged 57)
- Education: St Paul's School, London
- Occupation: Zoologist
- Father: George Albert Boulenger
- Scientific career
- Fields: Zoology

Edward George Boulenger (8 May 1888 – 30 April 1946) was a British zoologist and longtime director of the London Zoo aquarium.

Boulenger was the son of Belgian-born British herpetologist and ichthyologist George Albert Boulenger. He was educated at St. Paul's School, and became curator at the reptile house in London Zoo in 1911, a position he held for 13 years. During World War I he served as an observer in the balloon section of the Royal Flying Corps. In 1924 he became director of the newly opened seawater and freshwater aquarium of the Zoological Society of London, whose design and construction he had actively supported since 1921. In 1943 he resigned from his directorship.

Like his father, Boulenger was fluent in both French and German. This benefited him when he made several trips to mainland Europe to make new acquisitions for the reptile house and the aquarium. Furthermore, Boulenger worked as an author.

== Publications ==
- Reptiles and Batrachians (1914)
- A Naturalist at the Dinner Table (1927)
- A Naturalist at the Zoo (1927)
- Animal Mysteries (1927)
- The Under-Water World (1928)
- Fishes (1931)
- The Aquarium (1933)
- Apes and Monkeys (1936)
- A Natural History of the Seas (1936)
- Searchlight on Animals (1936)
