= Blaine W. Schubert =

American cave palaeontologist

- Citizenship: American
- Scientific career
- Institutions: East Tennessee State University

Blaine W. Schubert is an American vertebrate palaeontologist.

== Career ==
Schubert is a professor at East Tennessee State University, the director of the Don Sundquist Center of Excellence in Paleontology, and the curator of vertebrates at the East Tennessee State University Museum of Natural History. He primarily studies the Late Cenozoic, particularly the last five million years of Earth's history, examining how the time interval's climatic changes affected terrestrial fauna. He is also specifically interested in cave palaeontology.

A new species of fossil Colubrid snake from the Pliocene-aged Gray Fossil Site, Zilantophis schuberti, was named in his honor in 2017.

Below is a list of taxa that Schubert has contributed to naming:

Year	Taxon	Authors
2026	Dynamognathus robertsoni gen. et sp. nov.	Gunnin, Schubert, Samuels, Bredehoeft, & Maden
2015	Sternotherus bonevalleyensis sp. nov.	Bourque & Schubert
2015	Sternotherus palaeodorus sp. nov.	Bourque & Schubert
