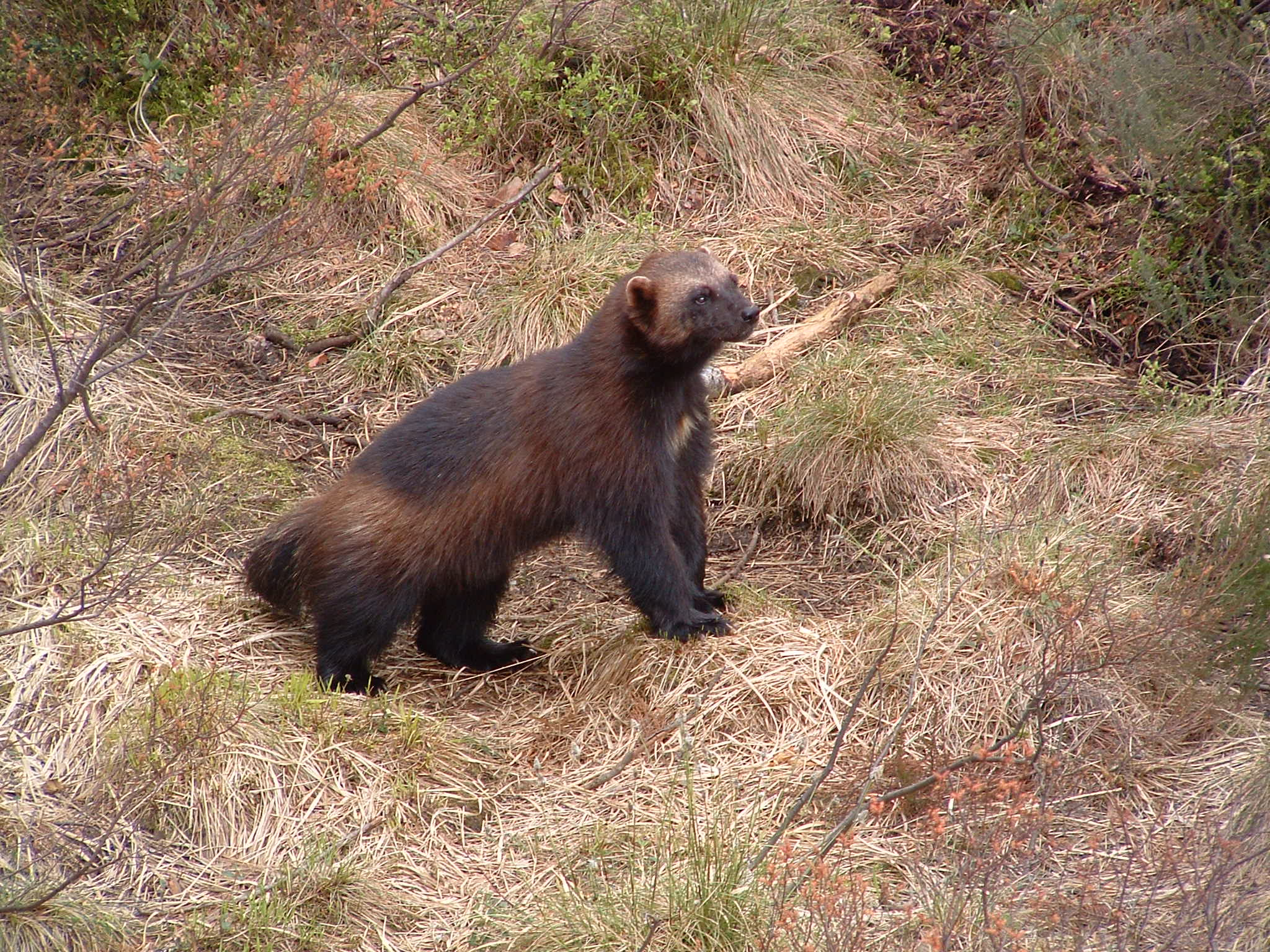
- Wolverine (G. gulo)

Scientific classification
- Kingdom: Animalia
- Phylum: Chordata
- Class: Mammalia
- Order: Carnivora
- Family: Mustelidae
- Subfamily: Guloninae; J.E. Gray, 1825

Type genus
- Gulo Pallas, 1780

Genera
- Eira; Gulo; Martes; Pekania

Synonyms
- Martinae Burmeister, 1850

= Guloninae =

Subfamily of carnivores

Guloninae is a subfamily of the mammal family Mustelidae distributed across Eurasia and the Americas. It includes martens, fishers, the tayra, and the wolverine. These genera were formerly included within a paraphyletic definition of the mustelid subfamily Mustelinae.

Most gulonine species are arboreal to a degree. Some of the fashion furs come from this subfamily, e.g. sable, marten.

== Species ==
=== Extant species ===
Image	Genus	Living species
	Eira Hamilton Smith, 1842	Tayra, E. barbara
	Gulo Pallas, 1780	Wolverine, G. gulo
	Martes Pinel, 1792 (martens)	American marten, M. americana; Pacific marten, M. caurina; Yellow-throated marten, M. flavigula; Beech marten, M. foina; Nilgiri marten, M. gwatkinsii; Pine marten, M. martes; Japanese marten, M. melampus; Sable, M. zibellina
	Pekania Gray, 1865	Fisher, P. pennanti

=== Extinct genera ===
- †Aragonictis Valenciano et al., 2022 - Middle Miocene Europe
  - A. araid
- †Circamustela Petter, 1967 - Middle to Late Miocene Spain, India and Germany
  - C. bhapralensis
  - C. dechaseauxi
  - C. hartmanni
  - C. peignei
  - C.? laevidens
- †Dehmictis Ginsburg and Morales, 1992 - Early Miocene Europe
- †Eiricitis - Early Pliocene Asia
  - E. pachygnatha
- †Laphictis Viret, 1933
- †Ischyrictis Helbing, 1930
- †Plesiogulo? Zdansky, 1924 - Middle Miocene to Pliocene
  - P. brachygnathus (Schlosser, 1903)
  - P. botori Haile-Selassie, Hlusko & Howell, 2004
  - P. crassa Teilhard de Chardin, 1945
  - P. marshalli (Martin, 1928)
  - P. lindsayi Harrison, 1981
  - P. monspessulanus Viret, 1939
  - P. praecocidens Kurtén, 1970
- †Sinictis Zdansky, 1924
  - S. dolichognathus
- †Sminthosinis Bjork, 1970 - Middle Miocene North America
  - S. bowleri
