= Zilantophis =

Zilantophis Temporal range: Zanclean

Scientific classification
- Kingdom: Animalia
- Phylum: Chordata
- Class: Reptilia
- Order: Squamata
- Suborder: Serpentes
- Family: Colubridae
- Genus: †Zilantophis
- Species: †Z. schuberti

Binomial name
- †Zilantophis schuberti Jasinski and Moscato, 2017

Extinct genus of colubrid snake

Zilantophis is an extinct monotypic genus of colubrid snake that lived in Tennessee during the Zanclean stage of the Pliocene epoch.

== Etymology ==
The generic name Zilantophis is composed of the roots Zilant, a Russian word for a legendary creature similar to a dragon or wyvern, and ophis, the Greek word for snake. The specific epithet of the type species, Zilantophis schuberti, honours the palaeontologist Blaine W. Schubert for his contributions to the study of the Gray Fossil Site and its herpetofauna.
