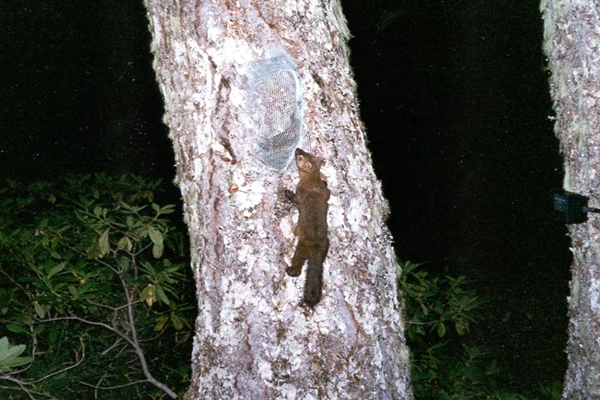
- Individual on tree in Six Rivers National Forest

Conservation status
- Critically Imperiled (NatureServe)

Scientific classification
- Kingdom: Animalia
- Phylum: Chordata
- Class: Mammalia
- Order: Carnivora
- Family: Mustelidae
- Genus: Martes
- Species: M. caurina
- Subspecies: M. c. humboldtensis

Trinomial name
- Martes caurina humboldtensis Grinnell and Dixon, 1926

= Humboldt marten =

Subspecies of carnivore

The Humboldt marten (Martes caurina humboldtensis), also known as the coastal marten, is an endangered, genetically distinct subspecies of the Pacific marten known from the old-growth coastal redwood forests, forests with dense shrub cover, areas with serpentine soils, and forested areas with dense understory cover of the U.S. states in coastal California and Oregon.

== Description ==
Humboldt martens are slender, with long, low-to-the-ground bodies similar to many other members of the weasel family (Mustelidae), plus shorter legs, large triangular ears, and a long tail. They are intermediate in size among many North American mustelid species, with the more coastal northwestern-California Humboldt marten typically smaller than its fellow American martens. Humboldt martens can be identified by their medium-length, yellowish-to-dark-brown, rich, glossy fur that contrasts with a lighter-colored throat patch and underfur, with darker fur on the feet, legs, and tail.

In a USDA study of 14 Humboldt martens captured in northwestern California from 2000-2001, the average body length was about 56.2 cm, with the tail making up about a third of that length. Males were slightly larger than females on average, with males averaging 58.8cm in length and 889g in weight, while females averaged 52.9cm in length and 599g in weight.

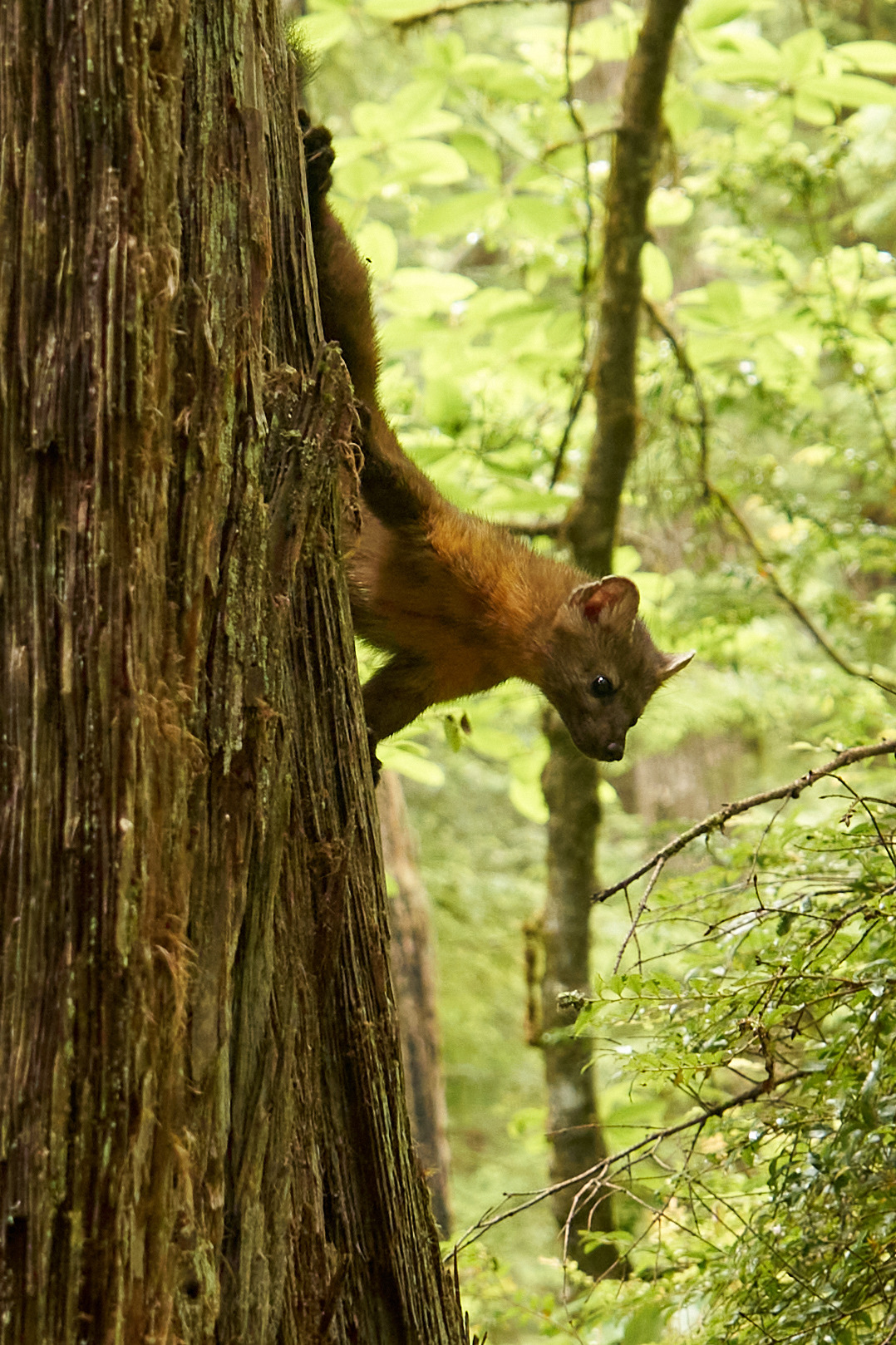
Humboldt marten on redwood tree

== Habitat and distribution ==
Fewer than 500 of them survive in both states combined, in four different populations; one in northern California, one straddling the California-Oregon border, one in southern Oregon, and one in the Oregon Dunes National Recreation Area. It is speculated that Humboldt martens in northern California and southern Oregon may be genetically connected into one large population, but there is no data to inform genetic connectedness as of 2020.

== Conservation ==
The subspecies was considered extinct until being rediscovered in the Six Rivers National Forest in 1996. They are most threatened by a lack of population expansion and by human-caused mortalities, including trapping and road mortality.

California banned all commercial trapping of martens since the 1950's, and Oregon banned trapping west of Interstate 5 in 2019. In California, the marten is threatened by the increasing number of marijuana farms destroying its habitat in the area. Humboldt martens were rated Endangered in California in 2019. Overall, the US Fish and Wildlife Service listed the Distinct Population Segment of coastal martens, synonymous with Humboldt martens, as Federally Threatened in 2020. Prior to 2020, there was confusion of the genetic composition of western marten subspecies.

=== Threats today ===
Humboldt Martens face several threats that make it difficult for them to survive in their natural habitats. One of the biggest threats is habitat loss, mainly caused by logging and land development. Because of Humboldt martens' reliance on forests with dense shrubs and large trees for shelter, losing these areas makes it hard for them to find food and rest. Additionally, wildfires are a growing concern because they can destroy large sections of the forest that martens depend on. Climate change is another factor because warmer temperatures and longer droughts can increase wildfire risk.

Another major threat to Humboldt martens is their small population size. They already occupy a very small portion of their historical range, so losing even a small amount of habitat could greatly impact the species. As forests become more fragmented, martens may have a harder time finding mates and moving between different areas, which will in turn hurt their population. They can also become more vulnerable to predators, such as bobcats and fishers, when there is less vegetation to provide cover. In addition, a small population can reduce genetic diversity, which makes it harder for the species to recover. Together, these threats continue to put the Humboldt marten at risk.

== Ecology ==
=== Humboldt marten's diet ===
The Humboldt marten classifies as an omnivore, which means it eats both animals and plants, though it eats mostly meat. Its diet includes small mammals (chipmunks, squirrels, mice, and voles), birds (small forest birds), berries (huckleberries, salal berries, and manzanita berries), insects (beetles, wasps, and bees), and reptiles (occasionally small lizards). One study from the Journal of Mammalogy found that approximately 72% of its dietary energy comes from mammals and 22% from birds. Humboldt martens also eat more berries in summer and fall than at other times of the year.

=== Habitat requirements ===
While total population size and exact distribution remain uncertain, a recent study near the California-Oregon (CA-OR) border shows that Humboldt martens occupy late-seral and old-growth forests, which provide sites for resting, denning, and preying. Trees and shrubs help them hide from predators, while forest-floor debris improves their hunting. As long as Humboldt martens can rest, den, and prey, they can persist in two low-productivity forest habitats: shore pine forests on stabilized dunes in central coastal Oregon and serpentine forests on ultramafic soils in northern coastal California and southern coastal Oregon. Under these conditions, the species occupies less than 8% of its historical range. However, Humboldt martens do not occur in habitats with young, small-diameter trees, even though these habitats comprise over 90% of their historical range. Only less than 5% of their historical range remains because habitat loss and other factors have largely extirpated the species. In all three habitat types, Humboldt martens persist in dense, shrub-covered areas. Because the Humboldt marten occupies less than 5% of its historical range, research can shed light on the conditions that allow the species to persist. This study can inform future conservation strategies.

Map showing the five critical habitat units designated for the coastal marten in northwestern California and southwestern Oregon in 2024.

=== Opportunities for restoration ===
On May 28, 2024, following a court agreement, the U.S. Fish and Wildlife Service designated more than 1.2 million acres in northwestern California and southwestern Oregon to protect habitat for the federally threatened Humboldt martens. In addition, the Service reached an agreement with private timber company Green Diamond Resources to exclude more than 49,000 acres from Humboldt marten habitat designation. Wildlife experts criticize the agreement because it exempts Green Diamond from federal land regulations and even offers a relocation plan that might not be feasible.

The most recent attempt to restore the Humboldt marten is the U.S. Fish and Wildlife Service's request for public input on its draft recovery plan. Overall, the plan aims to identify ways to help delist the Humboldt marten. Thus, the public had until July 28, 2026, to provide its perspective. This supports the goal of the Service to work with others to protect wildlife.

== Current research and monitoring ==
Scientists are continuing to study and monitor Humboldt martens, collecting data on population sizes, their habitat requirements, and also the genetic diversity of these martens. Because Humboldt martens are a rather elusive species, researchers often end up having to rely on surveys and statistical models to estimate populations. In 2025, one study estimated a median of 111 Humboldt martens in a 399-square-km area in northwestern California, with a 95% credible interval of 73-146 martens. An interesting finding was that marten density correlates with different environmental factors such as elevation and topography, and also the composition of the forest.

Another current research topic is on the genetic diversity of Humboldt martens and how isolated populations interact with one another. A 2026 study examined DNA samples from scat, hair, and tissue, then used them to distinguish individuals and determine whether genetic differences existed among Humboldt marten populations. The study found 93 new individuals and another undiscovered population, from which they found that Humboldt martens have, on average, 3 times more inbreeding and 20% less genetic diversity compared to Pacific martens. Each of these new findings and studies allow scientists to continue monitoring changes in Humboldt marten populations.
