= Circamustela =

Circamustela Temporal range: Mid to Late Miocene

Scientific classification
- Kingdom: Animalia
- Phylum: Chordata
- Class: Mammalia
- Infraclass: Placentalia
- Order: Carnivora
- Family: Mustelidae
- Subfamily: Guloninae
- Genus: †Circamustela; Petter, 1967

Species
- C. bhapralensis; C. dechaseauxi (type); C. hartmanni; C. peignei; C.? laevidens

Synonyms
- Martes laevidens?

Extinct genus of mammals

Circamustela an extinct genus of gulonine mustelids, known from the Miocene of Europe and Asia. There are four definitively known species, C. dechaseauxi and C. peignei, both known from Spain, C. bhapralensis from India, and C. hartmanni, known from Germany, as well as a fourth, tentatively assigned species, C. laevidens, also from Germany.
