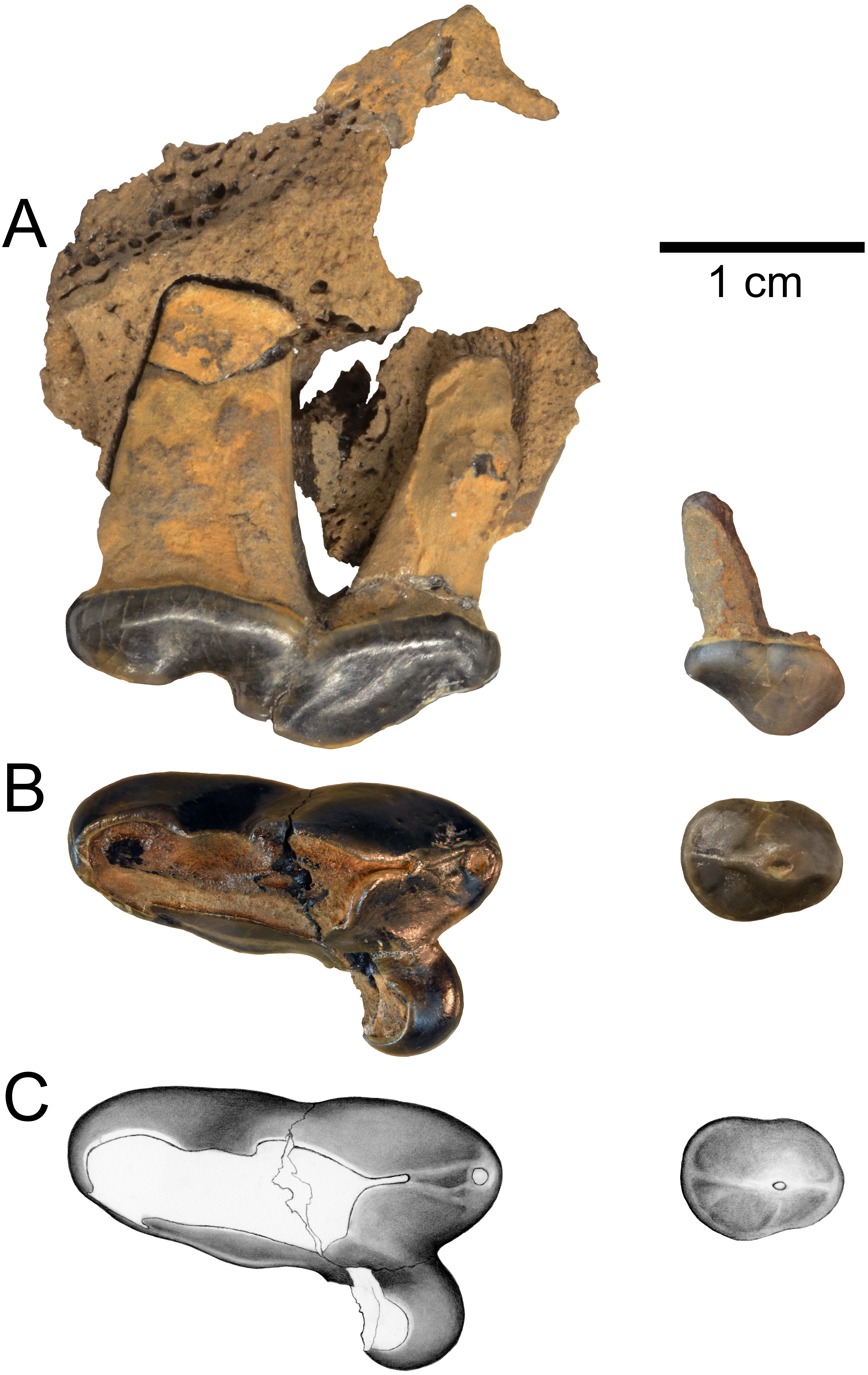
- The holotype specimen of Gulo sudorus (ETMNH 3663).

Scientific classification
- Kingdom: Animalia
- Phylum: Chordata
- Class: Mammalia
- Infraclass: Placentalia
- Order: Carnivora
- Family: Mustelidae
- Genus: Gulo
- Species: G. sudorus

Binomial name
- Gulo sudorus Samuels, Bredehoeft & Wallace, 2018

= Gulo sudorus =

Extinct species of wolverines

Gulo sudorus is an extinct species of wolverines that belongs to the family Mustelidae. It lived in North America and Eurasia during the early Pliocene epoch around 4.5-4.9 million years ago.

The holotype specimen of Gulo sudorus is ETMNH 3663 being discovered in Gray Fossil site located in eastern Tennessee.
