= Gray Fossil Site =

Pliocene-epoch assemblage of fossils

Coordinates: 36°23′10″N 82°29′53″W

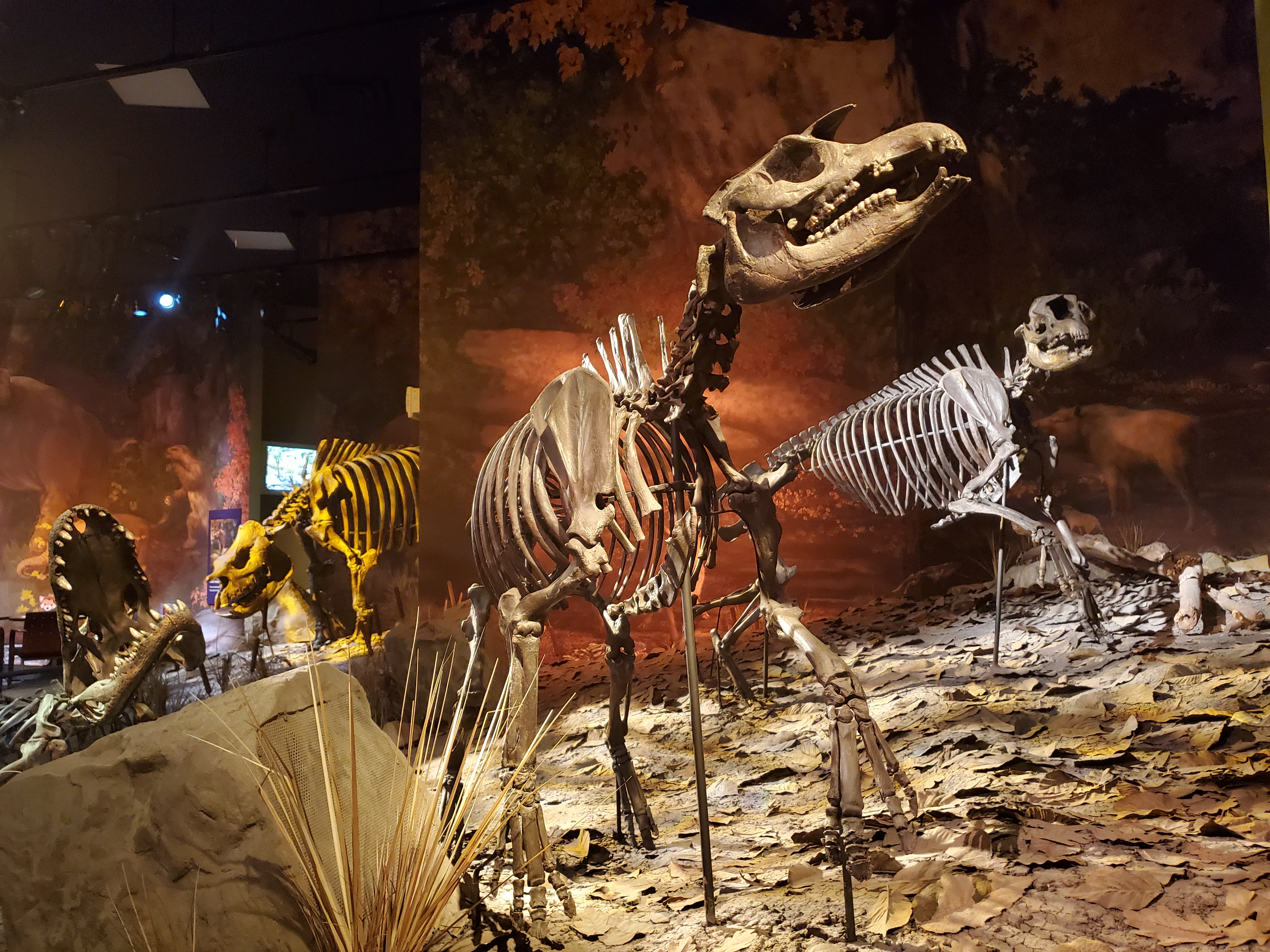
Exhibits at the Gray Fossil Site & Museum, including replicas of fossil tapirs, alligator, and rhinoceros.

The Gray Fossil Site is an Early Pliocene assemblage of fossils dating between 4.5 and 4.9 million years old, located near the community of Gray in Washington County, Tennessee, USA. The site was discovered during road construction on Tennessee State Route 75 by the Tennessee Department of Transportation in May 2000, after which local officials decided to preserve the site for research and education. The site became part of East Tennessee State University, and the Gray Fossil Site & Museum was opened on the site in 2007.

The ancient habitat of the Gray Fossil Site was a pond formed within a sinkhole surrounded by a warm, wet forest. The fossils found at the site represent the ancient plants and animals that lived and died in and around the sinkhole pond.

The Gray Fossil Site is the first of its age from the Appalachian region. Research at the site has yielded many discoveries, including new species of red panda, rhinoceros, pond turtle, hickory tree, and more. The site also hosts the world's largest known assemblage of fossil tapirs.

In the area that is now northeastern Tennessee, temperatures were much higher than today, with the climate supporting dense, humid forests.

== Formation ==
The Gray Fossil Site is a deposit of laminated clay and silt sediments laid down in an ancient lake that formed within a sinkhole. The deposit is oval in shape, covering an area of roughly 220 meters by 180 meters and ranging in depth from about 7 meters to 39 meters deep. The fossils within this deposit are abundant and often exceptionally well-preserved.

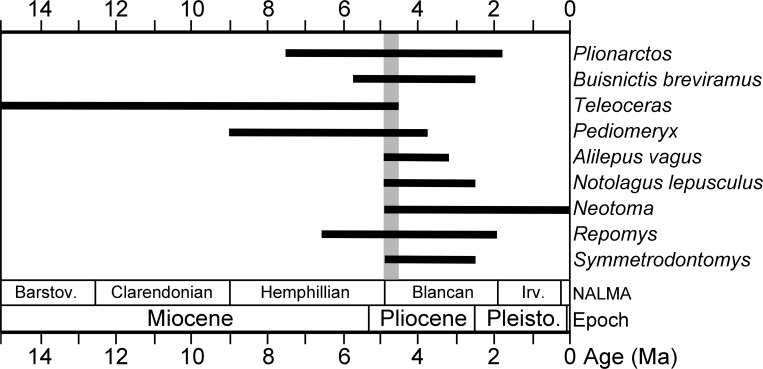
Stratigraphic ranges of mammals from the Gray Fossil Site. All of these species overlapped between 4.5 and 4.9 million years ago (gray bar). Image from Samuels et al. 2018.

The site is situated within the Knox Group formation, a series of Cambrian-Ordovician limestones. Groundwater flowing through joints in these rocks creates caves and sinkholes, forming a region of karst topography. The sinkhole that contains the fossil-rich deposits of the Gray Fossil Site is the result of a series of overlapping collapse events that ultimately formed one large basin. Sizable boulders deposited within the lake sediments indicate that the edge of the sinkhole once featured high walls or overhangs where chunks of rock could occasionally break off.

Based on the assemblage of mammal fossils uncovered at the site, the main deposit is estimated to date between 4.5 and 4.9 million years old, during the Early Pliocene Epoch near the transition of the Hemphilian and Blancan Land Mammal Ages. There is some evidence from drill cores for more ancient deposits deeper within the site, resulting from earlier stages of sinkhole collapse.

== History ==
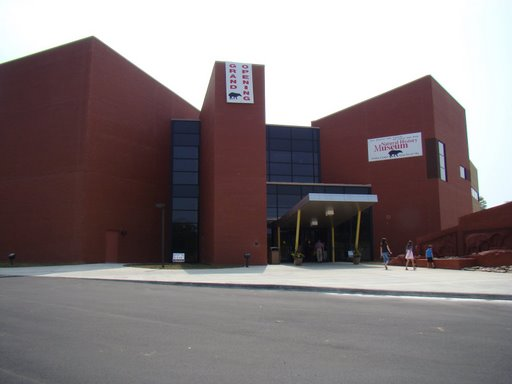
Gray Fossil Site & Museum during the Grand Opening in 2007.

In late May 2000, this fossil-rich deposit was discovered during a Tennessee Department of Transportation road construction project on the outskirts of Gray, TN. As it became clear that the fossils were unusual for this part of the country, members of the local community began an effort to preserve the site. In September 2000, Tennessee Governor Don Sundquist announced that the construction project would be moved so the fossil site could be saved and dedicated to research and education.

The Gray Fossil Site then became a project of East Tennessee State University, which began hiring paleontologists and geologists to oversee the site and create a new Department of Geosciences. The university founded the Don Sundquist Center of Excellence in Paleontology and began construction of an on-site museum to house research facilities and educational exhibits. The museum first opened in August 2007, originally known as the East Tennessee State University and General Shale Brick Natural History Museum and Visitor Center, but now known as the Gray Fossil Site & Museum.

== Paleoenvironment ==
The Gray Fossil Site was once a lake or pond surrounded by forest. The ancient lake was home to a diverse community of aquatic animals, including fish, pond turtles, aquatic salamanders, beavers, and alligators. Plant fossils found at the site, particularly pollen, indicate that the dominant vegetation of the forest was oak, hickory, and pine trees, along with various herbaceous species. Estimates for the density of this forest have varied; earlier research suggested a moderately dense forest, while later study indicated that the site might have been more of an open woodland where disruptive factors such as large herbivores, frequent fire, and drought limited the development of a closed canopy.

A 2020 study used fossil mammal teeth as a proxy to estimate the ancient climate conditions of the Gray Fossil Site, estimating a mean annual temperature of 16.8 °C, or 62.2 °F (similar to modern-day Atlanta, GA), and an annual precipitation of 1,343mm, or 52.9in (similar to modern-day Tampa, FL), with the minimum temperature of the coldest month reaching 2.6 °C, or 36.7 °F. These results line up with earlier hypotheses that the site had a warmer and wetter climate than modern East Tennessee based on the presence of warm-climate animals and plants like alligators, tupelo, and Corylopsis.

Many of the fossilized specimens from the site are closely related to modern-day species in Europe and Asia, including red pandas, European badgers, Chinese moonseed, and Corylopsis. This indicates that during the Early Pliocene, eastern North America maintained a biogeographic link with Eurasia.

== Paleobiota ==
The Gray Fossil Site is a Lagerstätte that boasts a rich assemblage of well-preserved fossils. It is the only fossil site in the Appalachian region dating near the boundary between the Miocene and Pliocene Epochs, and therefore offers a unique window into this region at this time.

The following taxon list is based on the Paleobiology Database, with additional sources cited where necessary:

=== Fish ===
Based on Maden & Samuels, 2023:

Genus	Species	Stratigraphic position	Material	Notes	Images
Lepomis	L. sp.			A freshwater sunfish.	
Micropterus	M. sp.			A freshwater sunfish.	

=== Amphibians ===
Many of the first records of modern salamanders have been identified from the Gray Fossil Site. These are the oldest known members of their families in the Appalachian mountains, a region well known for its modern salamander diversity.

Genus	Species	Stratigraphic position	Material	Notes	Images
Ambystoma	A. sp.			A mole salamander.	
Plethodon	P. sp.			A lungless salamander.	
Desmognathus	D. sp.			A dusky salamander.	
Dynamognathus	D. robertsoni			A giant lungless salamander, potentially the largest known. Type locality of genus and species.	
Notophthalmus	N. sp.			A newt.	
Rana	R. sp.			A true frog.	

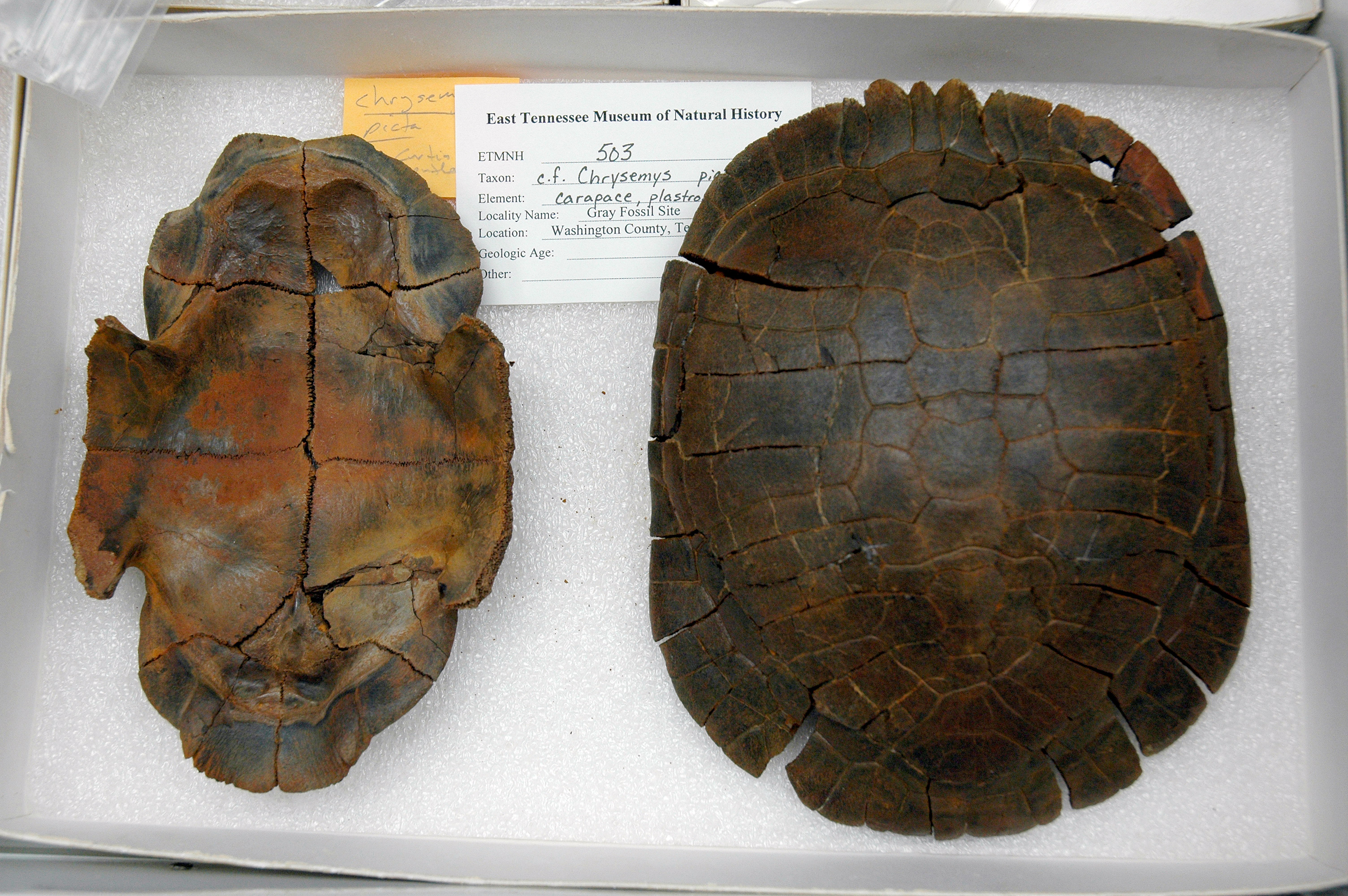
Fossil shell of Chrysemys (painted turtle) from the Gray Fossil Site.

=== Reptiles ===
==== Crocodilians ====
Genus	Species	Stratigraphic position	Material	Notes	Images
Alligator	A. sp.			An alligator. Appears to be distinct from known alligator species.	

==== Turtles ====
Genus	Species	Stratigraphic position	Material	Notes	Images
Chelydra	C. sp.			A snapping turtle.	
Chrysemys	C. sp.			A painted turtle.	
Hesperotestudo	H. sp.			A tortoise.	
Sternotherus	S. palaeodorus			A musk turtle. Type locality of species.	
Terrapene	T. sp.			A box turtle.	
Trachemys	T. haugrudi			A slider turtle. Type locality of species.	

==== Squamates ====
Based on:

Genus	Species	Stratigraphic position	Material	Notes	Images
Anguinae indet.				A glass lizard of uncertain affinities.	
Boidae indet.				A boa of uncertain affinities.	
Heloderma	H. sp.			A relative of the Gila monster.	
Masticophis	M. sp.			A coachwhip snake.	
cf. Neonatrix	cf. N. sp.			A colubrid snake.	
Nerodia	N. sp.			A watersnake.	
Pantherophis	P. sp.			A ratsnake.	
Pituophis	P. sp.			A gopher snake.	
cf. Regina	cf. R. sp.			A queen snake.	
cf. Sistrurus	cf. S. sp.			A pygmy rattlesnake.	
Viperidae indet.				A viperid of uncertain affinities.	
Zilantophis	Z. schuberti			A colubrid snake. Type locality of genus and species.	

=== Birds ===
A preliminary study in 2011 identified several families of birds at the Gray Fossil Site, the most common of which were ducks.

=== Mammals ===
Perissodactyls (odd-toed hoofed mammals)

- Tapirus polkensis (dwarf tapir). The Gray Fossil Site has the largest tapir population of any known fossil site, including fossil tapirs of all ages, from fetal individuals to very old adults.
- Teleoceras aepysoma (rhinoceros). Several specimens are known, including two nearly complete skeletons. In 2019, the Gray Fossil Site rhinos were identified as a new species, named the "high-bodied" Teleoceras for their longer front legs compared to other species.
- Cormohipparion emslei (three-toed horse)

Artiodactyls (even-toed hoofed mammals)

- Peccaries. Two species have been identified: Mylohyus elmorei and Prosthennops serus.
- Pediomeryx.
- Camel, possibly Megatylopus.
- Eocoileus gentryorum (New World deer)

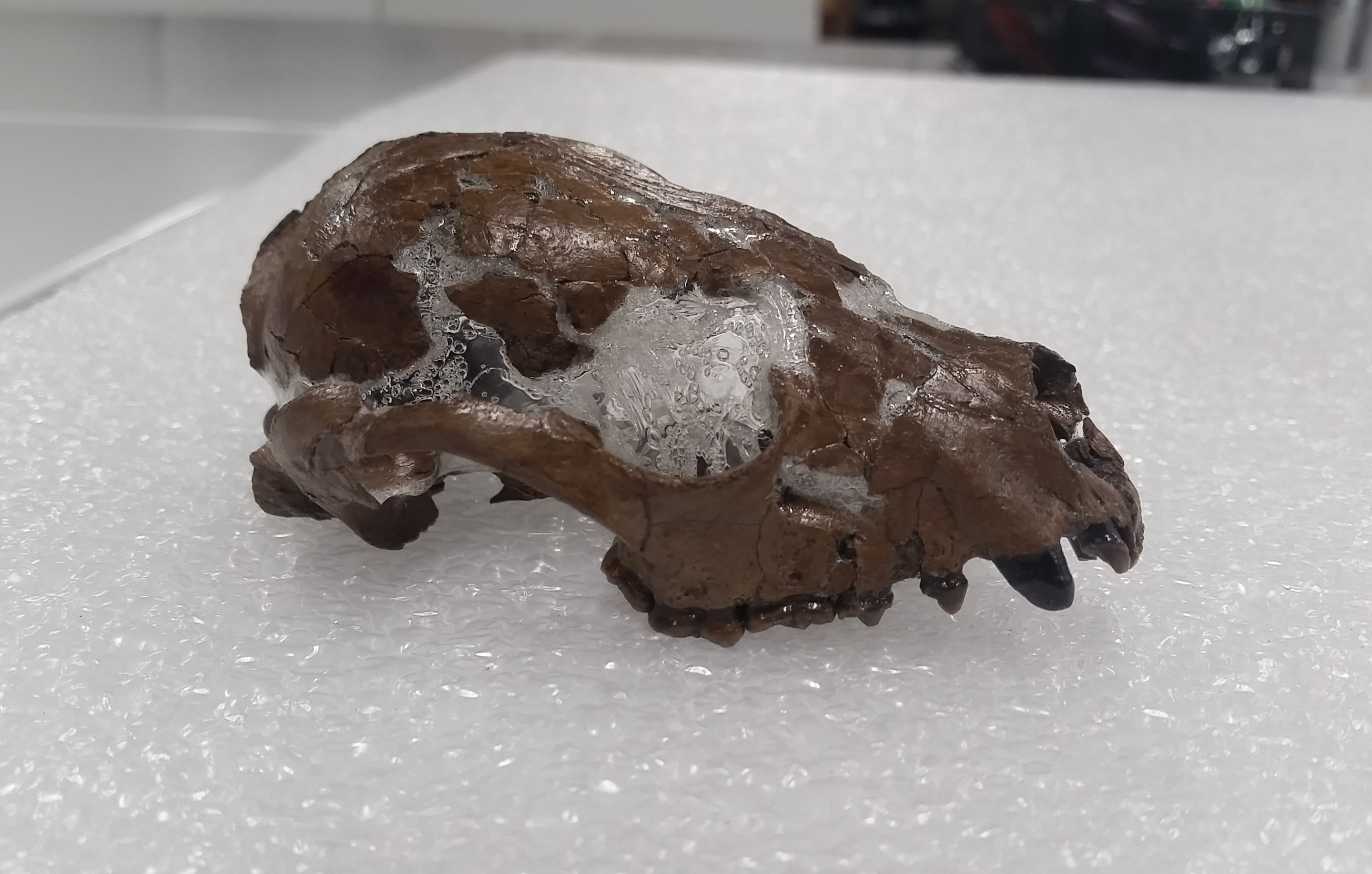
Fossil skull of Pristinailurus bristoli, Gray Fossil Site red panda.

Carnivora

- Pristinailurus bristoli (red panda). Named as a new species in 2004. Two nearly complete skeletons make this one of the best-known fossil pandas in the world.
- Arctomeles dimolodontus (Eurasian badger). This species was named alongside the Gray Fossil Site panda in 2004.
- Gulo sudorus (wolverine). The oldest known fossil wolverine. Named the "sweaty wolverine" since the ancient climate of Gray was much warmer than modern wolverine habitats.
- Plionarctos (short-faced bear).
- Saber-toothed cat, possibly Machairodus.
- Buisnictis breviramus (skunk).
- Borophagus (bone crushing dog).

Proboscidea (elephants)

- Mastodon. Likely a new species, represented by several specimens, including one nearly complete and very large skeleton. Early findings of proboscidean fossils at Gray were originally believed to belong to a gomphothere.

Rodents

- Several species, including beavers, packrats, and mice.
- Miopetaurista webbi (flying squirrel). A cat-sized flying squirrel in the genus Miopetaurista related to extant giant flying squirrels.

Lagomorphs

- Alilepus vagus (rabbit).
- Notolagus lepusculus (rabbit)

Bats

- Two species of vespertilionid bats.

Eulipotyphla

- Several species of shrews and moles.

Xenarthra

- An unknown species of megalonychid sloth.

=== Invertebrates ===
Aquatic invertebrates of the Gray Fossil Site include ostracods, snails, and small clams. Insects are also known from fossilized exoskeletal remains and trace fossils, including at least four different families of beetles. There are also reports of trilobite fossils from the area.

=== Plants ===
Plant fossils at the Gray Fossil Site include pollen, leaves, wood, fruits, seeds, and other structures which represent a diverse flora of angiosperms, conifers, ferns, lycophytes, and bryophytes. The forest flora was dominated by a variety of trees and shrubs, of which the most common were hickory, oak, and pine.

Several previously unknown extinct plant species have been identified at the Gray Fossil Site:

- Carya tennesseensis (hickory)
- Sinomenium macrocarpum (moonseed)
- Staphylea levisemia (bladdernut)
- Three species of Vitis (grapes)
- Corylopsis grisea (witch hazel)
- Passiflora sulcatasperma and Passiflora appalachiana (passion vines)
- Cavilignum pratchettii, the first extinct genus of plant identified at Gray.

=== Algae ===
Algal microfossils have been identified as numerous freshwater species, including one previously unknown extinct species, Stigmozygodites grayensis, named after the Gray Fossil Site in 2013.

=== Fungi ===
Several types of fungi have been identified from microfossil remains of fungal tissue and fruiting bodies.

== See also ==
- Ashfall Fossil Beds
- Pipe Creek Sinkhole
- Bone Valley Formation
- La Brea Tar Pits
- Lagerstätte
- List of fossil sites (with link directory)
