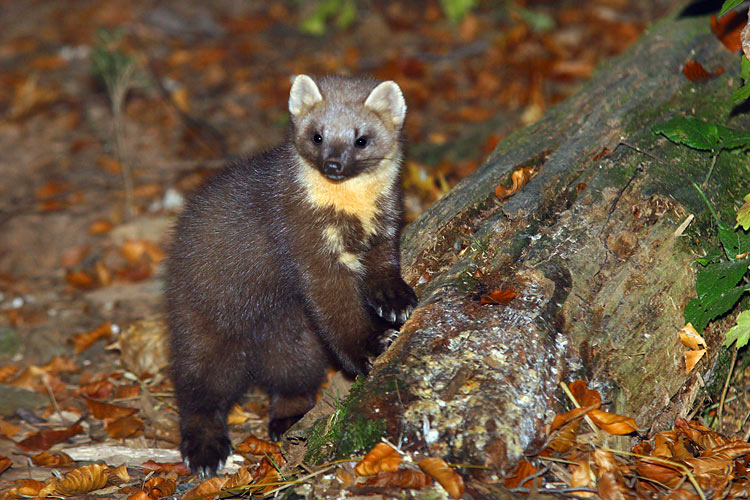
- European pine marten (Martes martes)

Scientific classification
- Kingdom: Animalia
- Phylum: Chordata
- Class: Mammalia
- Order: Carnivora
- Family: Mustelidae
- Subfamily: Guloninae
- Genus: Martes; Pinel, 1792

Type species
- Martes domestica Pinel, 1792 (= Mustela foina Erxleben, 1777)

Species
- See text
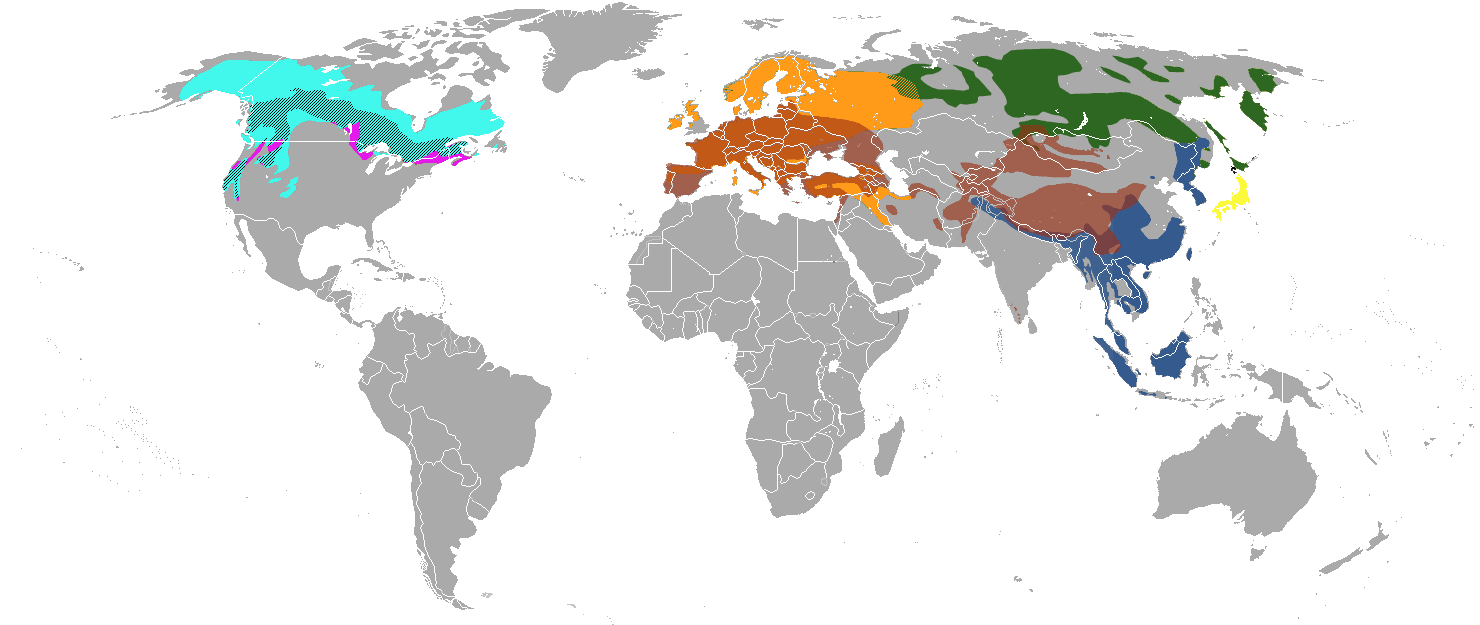
- Marten ranges: M. americana + caurina = cyan & teal; M. flavigula = dark blue & sepia; M. foina = rust, brown & sepia; M. gwatkinsii; M. martes = orange, rust & grass-green; M. melampus = yellow; M. zibellina = green & grass-green

= Marten =

Marten Temporal range: Miocene–recent

Genus of mammals

A marten is a weasel-like mammal in the genus Martes within the subfamily Guloninae, in the family Mustelidae. They have bushy tails and large paws with partially retractile claws. The fur varies from yellowish to dark brown, depending on the species; it is valued by animal trappers for the fur trade. Martens are slender, agile animals, which are adapted to living in the taiga, and inhabit coniferous and northern deciduous forests across the Northern Hemisphere.

== Classification ==
Results of DNA research indicate that the genus Martes is paraphyletic, with some studies placing Martes americana outside the genus and allying it with Eira and Gulo, to form a new New World clade. The genus first evolved up to seven million years ago during the Miocene epoch.

Genus Martes – Pinel, 1792 – eight species
Common name	Scientific name and subspecies	Range	Size and ecology	IUCN status and estimated population
American marten	Martes americana (Turton, 1806) Seven subspecies: M. a. americana; M. a. abieticola; M. a. abietinoides; M. a. actuosa; M. a. atrata; M. a. brumalis; M. a. kenaiensis	Arctic Alaska east to Newfoundland, south to New York	Size: Total length: 1.5 to 2.2 ft (0.5–0.7 m) Tail length: 5.4 to 6.4 in (135–160 mm) Adult weight: 1.1 to 3.1 lb (0.5–1.4 kg) Habitat: Diet:	LC
Pacific marten	Martes caurina (Merriam, 1890) Six subspecies: M. c. caurina; M. c. humboldtensis; M. c. nesophila; M. c. origensis; M. c. sierrae; M. c. vulpina	Southeast Alaska to central California, east to northern New Mexico	Size: Habitat: Diet:	LC
European pine marten	Martes martes (Linnaeus, 1758)	Europe and SW Asia, from Ireland in the west, eastward to the Urals and into Anatolia, Transcaucasia, Mesopotamia and northern Iran	Size: Length: Body up to 53 cm (21 in) long; tail up to 25 cm (9.8 in) Weight: 1.5–1.7 kg (3.3–3.7 lb) Habitat: Diet:	LC
Beech marten	Martes foina (Erxleben, 1777) Eleven subspecies: M. foina foina; M. foina bosniaca; M. foina bunites; M. foina kozlovi; M. foina intermedia; M. foina mediterranea; M. foina milleri; M. foina nehringi; M. foina rosanowi; M. foina syriaca; M. foina toufoeus	Spain and Portugal in the west, through Central and Southern Europe, the Middle East and Central Asia, extending as far east as the Altai and Tien Shan mountains and northwest China	Size: Body length: 38-59cm Tail Length: 23-32cm Weight: 1.1-2.1 kg Habitat: Diet:	LC
Yellow-throated marten	Martes flavigula Boddaert, 1785 Three subspecies: M. f. flavigula (Boddaert, 1785); M. f. chrysospila (Pocock, 1936); M. f. robinsoni	Afghanistan and Pakistan, in the Himalayas of India, Nepal and Bhutan, the Korean Peninsula, southern China, Taiwan and eastern Russia	Size: Body length: 50-72 cm (20-28 in.) Weight: 1.6-5.7 kg (3.5-12.6 lb.) Habitat: Diet:	LC
Nilgiri marten	Martes gwatkinsii (Horsfield, 1851)	Southern India	Size: Body length: 55–65 cm (22–26 in) Tail length: 40–45 cm (16–18 in) Weight: 2.1 kg (4.6 lb) Habitat: Diet:	VU
Sable	Martes zibellina (Linnaeus, 1758)	Russia, Eastern Kazakhstan, China, North Korea and Hokkaidō, Japan	Size: Body length: 35-56 cm (14-22 in.) Tail length: 7.2-12 cm (2.8-4.7 in.) Weight: 880-1,800 g (31-63 oz.) Habitat: Diet:	LC
Japanese marten	Martes melampus (Wagner, 1841) Two subspecies: M. m. melampus; M. m. tsuensis	Japan	Size: Body length: ~50 cm (1.6 ft.) Tail length: ~20 cm (8 in.) Weight: 1-1.5 kg (2.2-3.3 lb.) Habitat: Diet:	LC

== Fossils ==
Several fossil martens have been described, including:

- †Martes campestris (Pliocene)
- †Martes wenzensis (Pliocene)
- †Martes vetus (Pleistocene)

Another described fossil species, Martes nobilis from the Holocene, is now considered synonymous with the American marten.

== Etymology ==
The Modern English "marten" comes from the Middle English martryn, in turn borrowed from the Anglo-French martrine and Old French martre, itself from a Germanic source; cf. Old English mearþ, Old Norse mörðr, and Old High German and Yiddish מאַרדאַר mardar.

marten (n.)

agile, short-legged, bushy-tailed, medium-sized carnivorous mammal in the weasel family, largely nocturnal and found in forests across the colder parts of the northern hemisphere, c. 1300, martrin, "skin or fur of the marten," from Old French martrine "marten fur," noun use of fem. adjective martrin "of or pertaining to the marten," from martre "marten," from Frankish *martar or some other Germanic source, from Proto-Germanic *marthuz (source also of Old Saxon marthrin "of or pertaining to the marten," Old Frisian merth, Middle Dutch maerter, Dutch marter, Old High German mardar, German Marder, Old English mearþ, Old Norse mörðr "marten").

The ultimate etymology is unknown. Some suggest it is from PIE *martu- "bride," on some fancied resemblance. Or it might be a substrate word or a Germanic euphemism for the real name of the animal, which might have been taboo. In Middle English the animal itself typically was called marter, directly from Old French martre, but martrin took over this sense in English after c. 1400. The form marten is from late 16c., perhaps due to association with the masc. proper name Martin.

== Ecology and behaviour ==
Martens are solitary animals, meeting only to breed in late spring or early summer. Litters of up to five blind and nearly hairless kits are born in early spring. They are weaned after around two months, and leave the mother to fend for themselves at about three to four months of age. They are omnivorous.

=== Spatial niche segregation ===
The stone marten and the pine marten segregate spatially where they occur in sympatry. This spatial niche segregation is due to the differences regarding their food preferences, adaptability to cold climates and avoidance of predators. The spatial niche segregation between stone and pine martens is also influenced by each species' habitat preferences and resource availability within specific ecosystems. Studies in Belarus show that the pine marten is more densely distributed in clay-rich, biodiverse woodlands, whereas the stone marten is adapted to habitats with greater resource limitations, such as sandy soils, where it relies more on seasonally available resources such as berries and carrion to meet its dietary needs. In Ireland and Italy, the pine marten displays seasonal stability in home ranges within well-resourced habitats, suggesting that resource abundance can enhance spatial exclusivity and reduce direct competition between species.

== In human culture ==
=== Canada ===
The marten is populous in the northern Ontario community of Big Trout Lake. During the fur trade, commissioned by the Hudson Bay Company in the 18th and 19th centuries, the marten pelt was typically fashioned into mittens. The marten is still traded locally. The locals place a high value on this pelt, typically trading it for consumable goods.

=== Croatia ===
In the Middle Ages, marten pelts were highly valued goods used as a form of payment in Slavonia, the Croatian Littoral, and Dalmatia. The marturina was a form of tax named after this. The banovac, a coin struck and used between 1235 and 1384, included the image of a marten. This is one of the reasons why the Croatian word for marten, kuna, was the name of the former Croatian currency. A marten is depicted on the obverse of the 1-, 2-, and 5-kuna coins, minted since 1993, and on the reverse of the 25-kuna commemorative coins. With adoption of euro as the national currency in 2023, a marten continues to be depicted on the obverse of the Croatian 1 euro coin.

A running marten is shown on the coat of arms of Slavonia and subsequently on the modern design of the coat of arms of Croatia. The official seal of the Croatian Parliament from 1497 until the late 18th century had a similar design.

=== Finland ===
The Finnish communications company Nokia derives its name, via the river Nokianvirta, from a type of marten locally known as the nokia.

=== Greece ===
In the Illiad, the fleet-footed spy Dolon wore a marten-pelt cap.

=== Italy ===
The Latin word for helmet, galea, originally meant "marten pelt", although it is unclear whether early Romans wore these helmets for symbolical reasons or for their fine fur.
