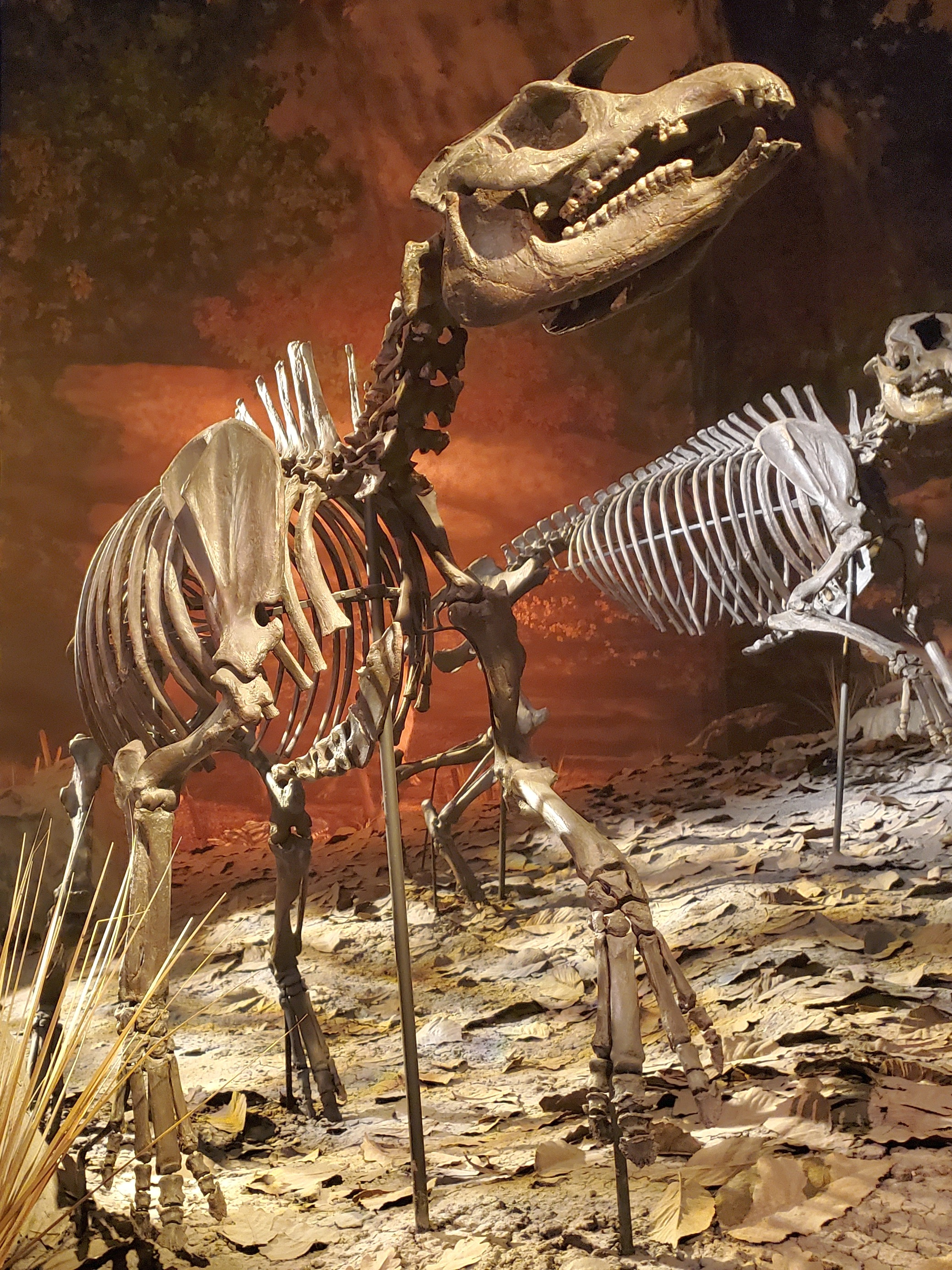
- Fossil replicas on display at the Gray Fossil Site & Museum
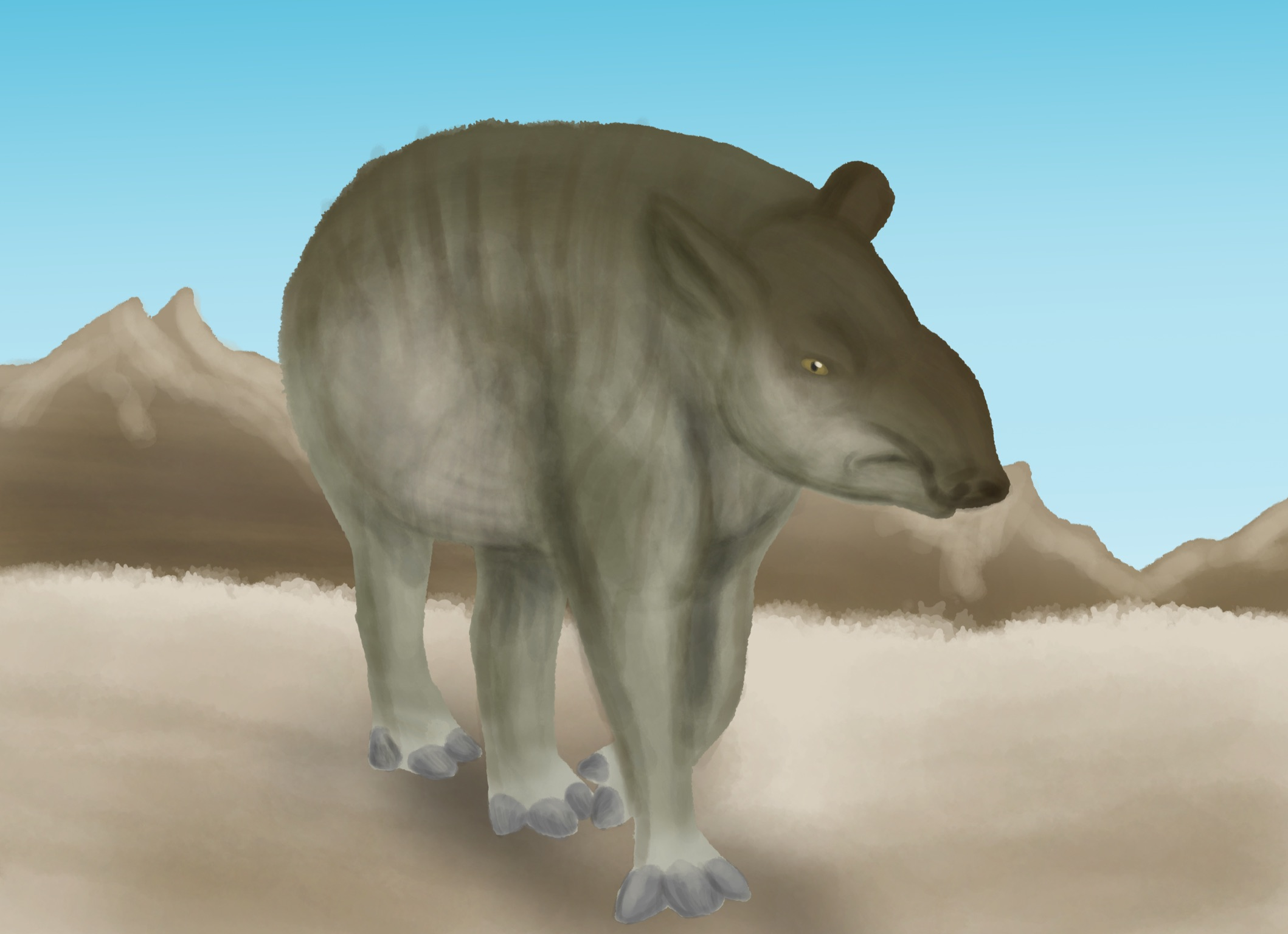
- Life restoration of Tapirus polkensis

Scientific classification
- Kingdom: Animalia
- Phylum: Chordata
- Class: Mammalia
- Infraclass: Placentalia
- Order: Perissodactyla
- Family: Tapiridae
- Genus: Tapirus
- Species: †T. polkensis

Binomial name
- †Tapirus polkensis Olsen, 1960

= Tapirus polkensis =

Tapirus polkensis Temporal range: Late Miocene–Early Pliocene

Extinct species of mammal

Tapirus polkensis, the pygmy tapir, is a small prehistoric tapir that lived in North America during the late Miocene and early Pliocene. T. polkensis had an estimated mass of around 125 kg (276 lb), making it smaller than any extant tapir.

The Gray Fossil Site in northeast Tennessee is home to the world's largest known fossil assemblage of T. polkensis.

== Palaeoecology ==
Analysis of its tooth enamel δ^{13}C values reveals T. polkensis to have been a forest-dwelling browser. Finite element analysis (FEA) of the skull of T. polkensis suggests that it was strong enough to engage in hard-object feeding during unilateral biting but not bilateral biting, although dental microwear texture analysis (DMTA) indicates that this species was predominantly folivorous and seldom ate hard objects.
