= Plesiogulo =

Plesiogulo Temporal range: Miocene-Pliocene
- P. brachygnathus skeleton, Shanghai Natural History Museum

Scientific classification
- Kingdom: Animalia
- Phylum: Chordata
- Class: Mammalia
- Order: Carnivora
- Family: Mustelidae
- Genus: †Plesiogulo; Zdansky, 1924

Species
- See text

Extinct genus of carnivores

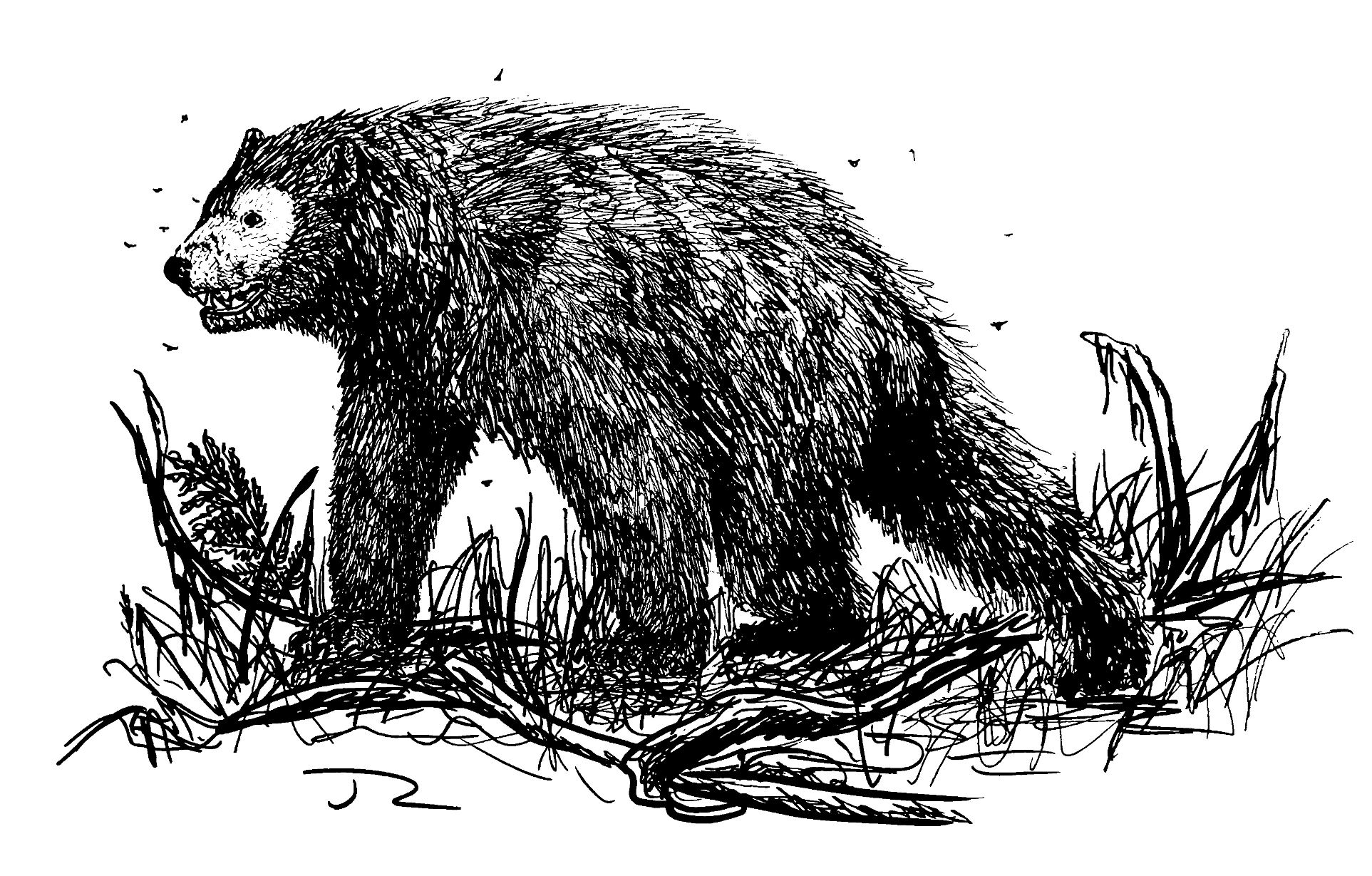
Plesiogulo marshalli

Plesiogulo is a genus of prehistoric carnivore that lived from the Miocene to the Pliocene of Africa, Eurasia, and North America. An ancestral relationship to the wolverine (Gulo gulo) was once suggested, but it is no longer considered likely. However, some authorities still consider it a member of the Guloninae.

== Species ==
The following species have been currently described for this genus:

- †P. brachygnathus (Schlosser, 1903)
- †P. botori Haile-Selassie, Hlusko & Howell, 2004
- †P. crassa Teilhard de Chardin, 1945
- †P. marshalli (Martin, 1928)
- †P. lindsayi Harrison, 1981
- †P. monspessulanus Viret, 1939
- †P. praecocidens Kurtén, 1970

== Palaeobiology ==
=== Palaeoecology ===
P. crassa was a generalist omnivore, feeding on a variety of small animals while also supplementing its diet with mushrooms and fruits.
