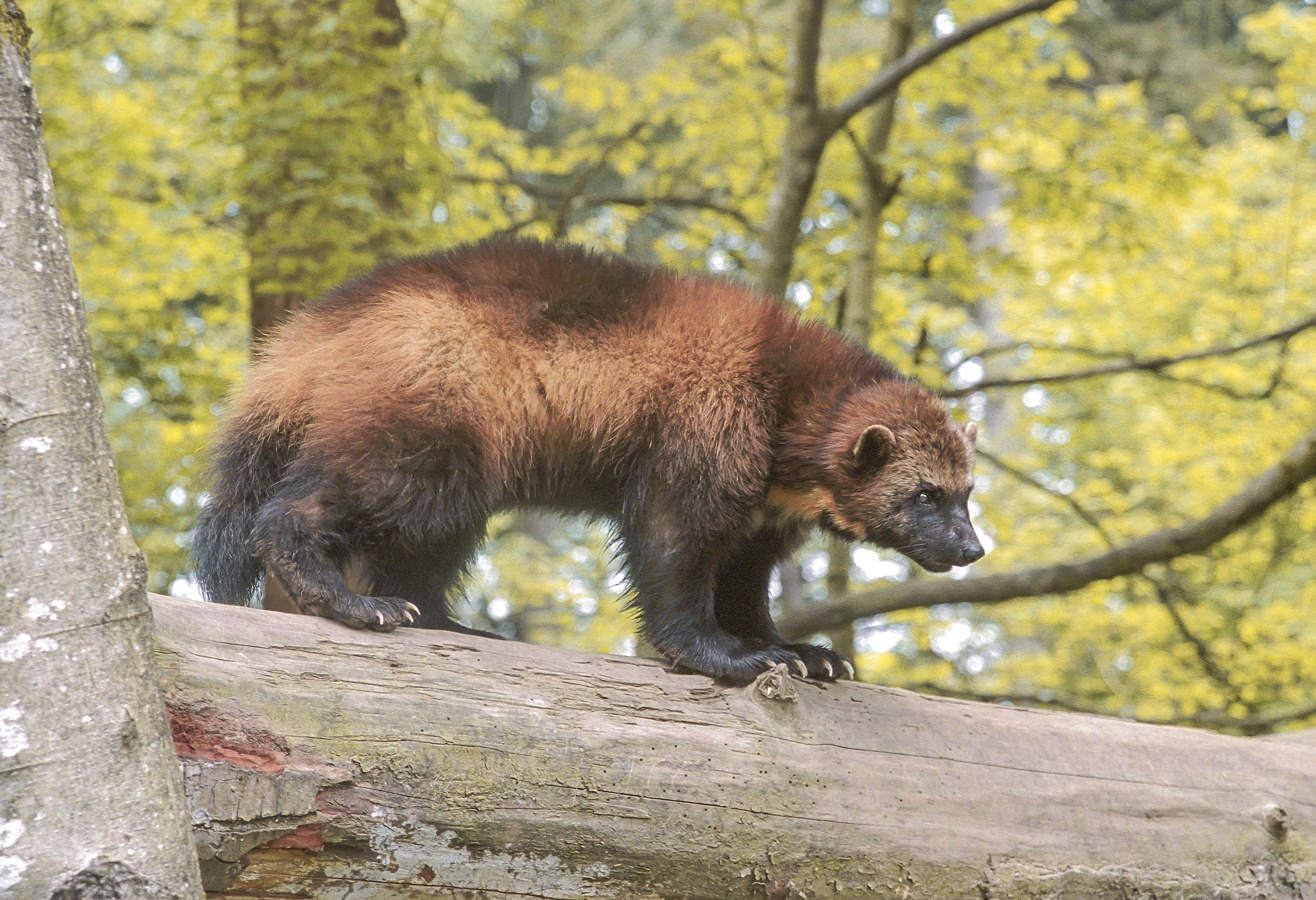

Scientific classification
- Kingdom: Animalia
- Phylum: Chordata
- Class: Mammalia
- Order: Carnivora
- Family: Mustelidae
- Subfamily: Guloninae
- Genus: Gulo; Pallas, 1780

Type species
- Gulo sibiricus Linnaeus, 1758

Species
- G. gulo; G. minor †; G. schlosseri †; G. sudorus †

= Gulo =

Gulo Temporal range: Pliocene – recent

Genus of carnivores

Gulo is a genus of carnivoran mammals in the family Mustelidae. It contains one extant species, the wolverine (G. gulo), as well as several extinct ones. Fossil evidence suggests that this genus appeared in North America and later spread to Eurasia during the Pliocene. Diagnostic traits include a strongly reduced P2, a robust P4 with three roots, and upper molars smaller than in other gulonines. Overall, the teeth are adapted for hypercarnivory.
