= Dynamognathus =

Dynamognathus Temporal range: Early Pliocene

Scientific classification
- Kingdom: Animalia
- Phylum: Chordata
- Class: Amphibia
- Order: Urodela
- Family: Plethodontidae
- Genus: †Dynamognathus
- Species: †D. robertsoni

Binomial name
- †Dynamognathus robertsoni Gunnin et al., 2025

Extinct genus of salamanders

Dynamognathus is an extinct genus of plethodontid salamander known from the Pliocene (Zanclean stage) Gray Fossil Site of Tennessee, United States.

== Palaeobiology ==
Dynamognathus robertsoni has been inferred to have had a fossorial lifestyle, based on its morphological similarity to the extant Red Hills salamander.
