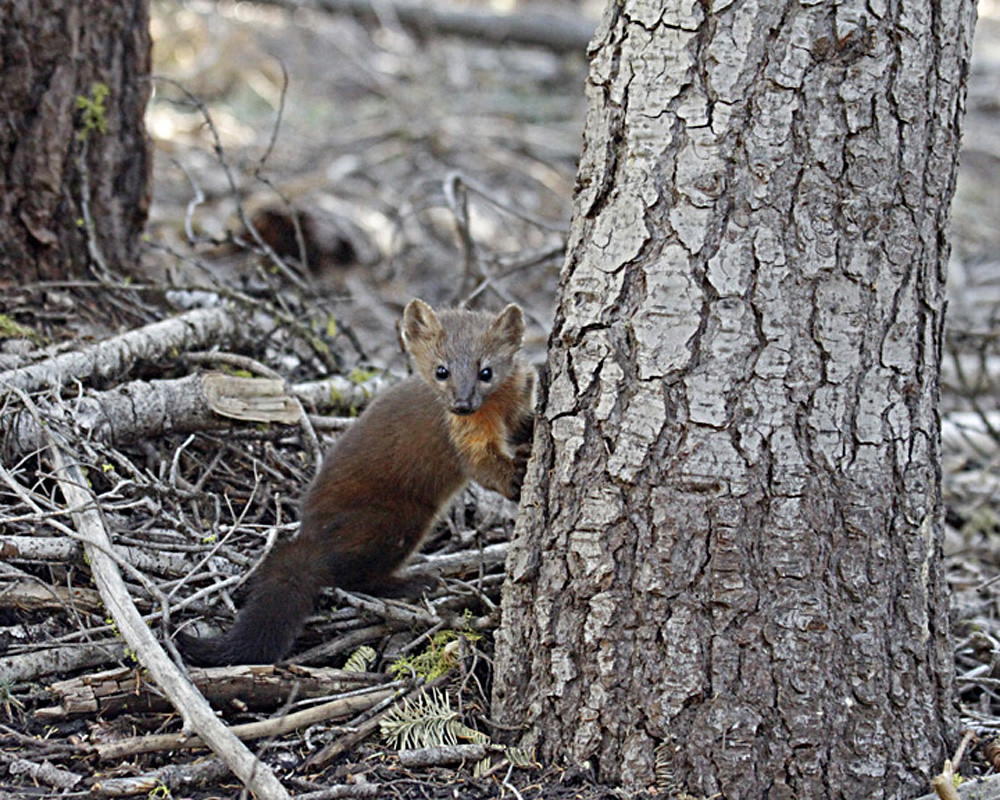
- In Lassen National Forest, California

Conservation status
- Apparently Secure (NatureServe)

Scientific classification
- Kingdom: Animalia
- Phylum: Chordata
- Class: Mammalia
- Order: Carnivora
- Family: Mustelidae
- Genus: Martes
- Species: M. caurina

Binomial name
- Martes caurina (Merriam, 1890)

Subspecies
- M. c. caurina; M. c. humboldtensis; M. c. nesophila; M. c. origensis; M. c. sierrae; M. c. vulpina

Synonyms
- Species level: Alopecogale caurina; Subspecies level: Martes americana caurina; Alopecogale americana caurina

= Pacific marten =

Species of carnivore

The Pacific marten (Martes caurina) is a species of North American mammal, a member of the family Mustelidae. It is found throughout western North America.

== Taxonomy ==
The species was formerly considered conspecific with the American marten (M. americana), but several studies using molecular genetics indicate that M. caurina is a distinct species from it, and it has since been recognized as such by the American Society of Mammalogists. The two species also have some morphological differences, with M. caurina having a shorter rostrum and a broader cranial shape. The two species are thought to have diverged during the Last Glacial Maximum after being isolated from one another in glacial refugia.

=== Subspecies ===
Seven subspecies have been recognized based on fossil history, cranial analysis, and mitochondrial DNA analysis. None of the subspecies are separable based on morphology, and subspecies taxonomy is usually ignored except with regards to conservation issues centered around subspecies rather than ranges.

Martes caurina subspecies group:

- M. c. caurina (Merriam) - western British Columbia, Washington, and Oregon;
- M. c. humboldtensis (Grinnell and Dixon) - northwestern California;
- M. c. nesophila (Osgood) - southern Alaska;
- M. c. origenes (Rhoads) - Utah, Colorado, New Mexico;
- M. c. sierrae (Grinnell and Storer) - northeastern California;
- M. c. vulpina (Rafinesque) - eastern Oregon, Idaho, and western Montana and Wyoming.

M. c. sierrae is considered a vulnerable subspecies by NatureServe.

== Distribution ==
The Pacific marten has a wide but fragmented distribution throughout western North America; this distribution is thought to be a consequence of the pattern in which it colonized new areas as the ice sheets retreated. Its range extends from the Alexander and Haida Gwaii archipelagos south along the Pacific Northwest coast to Humboldt County, California, and east to the southern Rocky Mountains, reaching as far south as New Mexico. A broad hybrid zone between the Pacific and American martens is known to exist in the Columbia Mountains, as well as Kupreanof and Kuiu Islands in Alaska. The species is known to inhabit deciduous and coniferous forests in areas such as the Pacific Northwest of the United States, and through the Rocky Mountains and Sierra Nevada. In Oregon, Pacific martens occur in higher terrain due to their ability to survive larger snow levels. They are separated in two habitats, the coastal mountains, where they occur in lower elevations as well, and the Cascade Range, mostly in mountainous areas with pine forests, separated by more unsuitable habitat in the lowlands and valleys.

== Home range ==
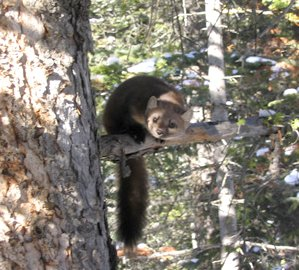
Pacific martens have a bushy tail.

Males and females in northeastern California appeared to have approximately equal home range size. In northeastern California, movements and home range boundaries were influenced by cover, topography (forest-meadow edges, open ridgetop, lakeshores), and other Pacific marten. In northwestern Montana, home range boundaries appeared to coincide with the edge of large open meadows and burned areas; the authors suggested that open areas represent "psychological rather than physical barriers".

== Behavior ==
In northeastern California, more time was spent traveling and hunting in summer than in winter, suggesting that reduced winter activity may be related to thermal and food stress or may be the result of larger prey consumption and consequent decrease in time spent foraging. Also in northeastern California, activity in the snow-free season (May–December) was diurnal, while winter activity was largely nocturnal. Year-round daily movements in Grand Teton National Park ranged from 0 to 2.83 miles (0.00 to 4.55 km), averaging 0.6-mile (0.97 km), observations of 88 individuals).

=== Weather factors ===
In southeastern Wyoming, temperature influenced resting site location. Above-snow sites were used during the warmest weather, while subnivean sites were used during the coldest weather, particularly when temperatures were low and winds were high following storms. High mortality may occur if Pacific marten become wet in cold weather, as when unusual winter rains occur during live trapping. In Yosemite National Park, drought conditions increased the diversity of prey items; Pacific marten consumed fish and small mammal species made more accessible by low snow conditions in a drought year. Pacific marten may travel extensively under the snowpack. Subnivean travel routes of >98 feet (30 m) were documented in northeastern Oregon and up to 66 feet (20 m) in Wyoming.

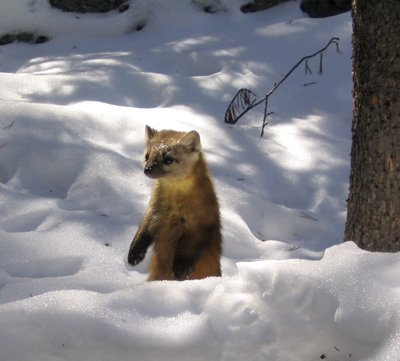
Pacific martens remain active in winter.

Adaptations to deep snow are particularly important in areas where the Pacific marten is sympatric with the fisher, which may compete with and/or prey on Pacific marten. In California, Pacific marten were closely associated with areas of deep snow (>9 inches (23 cm)/winter month), while fishers were more associated with shallow snow (<5 inches (13 cm)/winter month). Overlap zones were areas with intermediate snow levels. Age and recruitment ratios suggested that there were few reproductive Pacific marten where snow was shallow and few reproductive fishers where snow was deep.

In north-central Idaho, Pacific marten activity was highest in areas where snow depths were <12 inches (30 cm). This was attributed to easier burrowing for food and more shrub and log cover.

== Reproduction ==
Observations from Oregon suggest that juveniles may disperse in early spring. Of nine juvenile Pacific marten that dispersed in spring in northeastern Oregon, three dispersed a mean of 20.7 miles (33.3 km) (range: 17.4–26.8 miles (28.0–43.1 km)) and established home ranges outside of the study area. Three were killed after dispersing distances ranging from 5.3 to 14.6 miles (8.5 to 23.5 km), and three dispersed a mean of 5.0 miles (8.0 km) (range: 3.7–6.0 miles (6.0–9.7 km)) but returned and established home ranges in the area of their original capture. Spring dispersal ended between June and early August, after which individuals remained in the same area and established a home range.

== Food habits ==
Marten are omnivorous, with rodents and rabbits being common prey. Birds were the most important prey item in terms of frequency and volume on Haida Gwaii, British Columbia. Fish may be important in coastal areas. Diet is less diverse within the Pacific marten's range than with the American marten, although there is diversity in Pacific states.

== Mortality ==
Pacific marten are vulnerable to predation from many other species. In deciduous forests in northeastern British Columbia, most predation was attributed to raptors. Of 18 Pacific marten killed by predators in northeastern Oregon, 8 were killed by bobcats (Lynx rufus), 4 by raptors, 4 by other marten, and 2 by coyotes (Canis latrans). Throughout the distribution of Pacific marten, other predators include the great horned owl (Bubo virginianus), bald eagle (Haliaeetus leucocephalus), golden eagle (Aquila chrysaetos), Canada lynx (Lynx canadensis), mountain lion (Puma concolor), fisher (Pekania pennanti), wolverine (Gulo gulo), grizzly bear (Ursus arctos horribilis), American black bear (Ursus americanus), and grey wolf (Canis lupus). In northeastern Oregon, most predation (67%) occurred between May and August, and no predation occurred between December and February. Bobcats were also the main source of predation in northern California.

== Threats ==
Due to its more fragmented distribution than the American marten, the Pacific marten is more vulnerable to inbreeding and the island effect. Due to their status as commercially valuable fur bearers, American martens have frequently been translocated throughout North America, with no thought given to whether the martens were originally native to the area they were translocated to, and this can often lead to anthropogenic hybridization, genetic swamping, and/or outbreeding depression. On Dall Island, American martens have been introduced and are hybridizing with the native Pacific marten population, which may put it at risk. On many islands throughout the Alexander Archipelago, American martens have been introduced and are present, with no sign of the Pacific martens; it is unknown whether the islands previously had no marten species until American martens were introduced, or whether the Pacific martens existed on those islands previously but were extirpated by the introduced American martens. In addition, genetic evidence of introgression with American martens is present in other parts of the Pacific marten's range, which is likely also a consequence of American marten introductions.

The species is thought to have critically low populations on the Olympic Peninsula in Washington state; surveys indicate that martens have been extirpated at the low-elevation areas they once occurred at, and now only persist at low densities in the higher-elevation areas of the peninsula. This is thought to be a consequence of habitat modifications from forest management, urbanization, and agricultural land uses. Demographic risks associated with small population sizes and climate change may pose further risks to the already-small marten population.

The Pacific Northwest subspecies, the Humboldt marten, is highly threatened, with only a few hundred individuals remaining.
