= Sternotherus palaeodorus =

Sternotherus palaeodorus Temporal range: Early Pliocene

Scientific classification
- Kingdom: Animalia
- Phylum: Chordata
- Class: Reptilia
- Order: Testudines
- Suborder: Cryptodira
- Family: Kinosternidae
- Genus: Sternotherus
- Species: †S. palaeodorus

Binomial name
- †Sternotherus palaeodorus Bourque and Schubert, 2015

Extinct species of turtle

Sternotherus palaeodorus is an extinct species of kinosternid turtle in the genus Sternotherus that lived in North America during the Zanclean stage of the Pliocene epoch.

== Etymology ==
The specific epithet of the species derives from the Greek word palaios, meaning ancient, and the Latin word odorus, meaning stinky.
