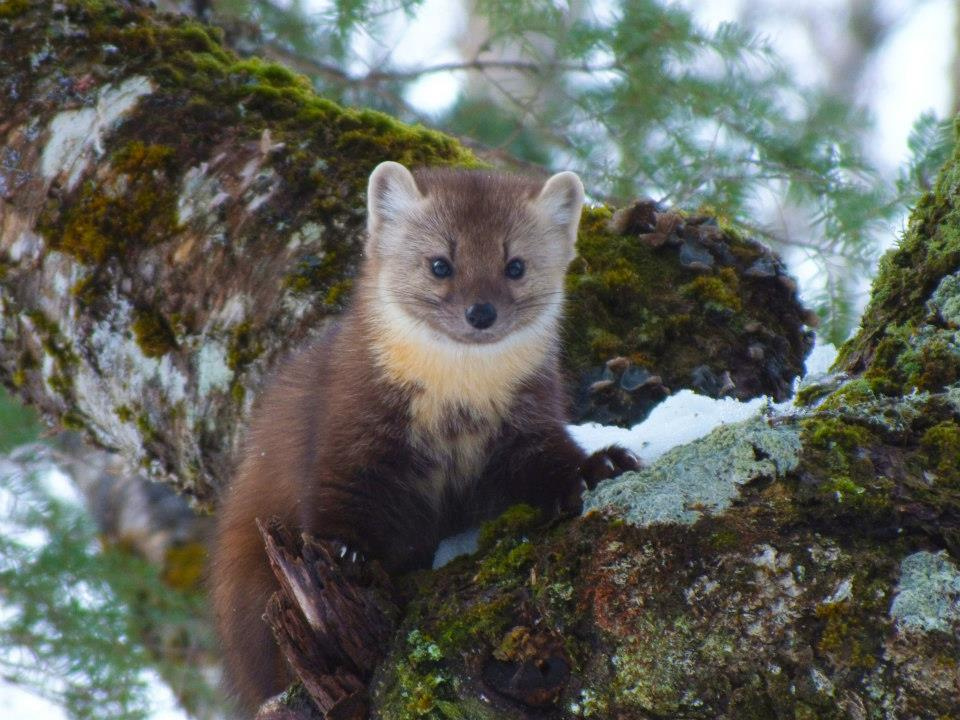
- Newfoundland pine marten, a subspecies of the American marten

Conservation status
- Least Concern (IUCN 3.1)

- Secure (NatureServe)

Scientific classification
- Kingdom: Animalia
- Phylum: Chordata
- Class: Mammalia
- Order: Carnivora
- Family: Mustelidae
- Genus: Martes
- Species: M. americana

Binomial name
- Martes americana (Turton, 1806)

Subspecies
- M. a. americana; M. a. abieticola; M. a. abietinoides; M. a. actuosa; M. a. atrata; M. a. brumalis; M. a. kenaiensis
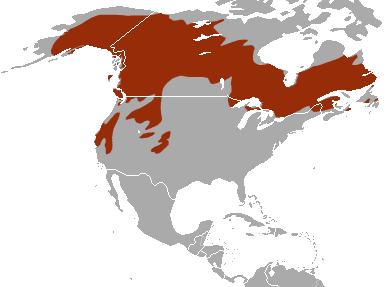
- American marten range (note: map is missing distribution in parts of Wisconsin, New York, and New England; includes a range of Pacific marten)

Synonyms
- Martes nobilis; Alopecogale americana; Alopecogale nobilis

= American marten =

Species of North American mammal

The American marten (Martes americana), also known as the American pine marten, is a species of North American mammal, a member of the family Mustelidae. The species is sometimes referred to as simply the pine marten. The name "pine marten" is derived from the common name of the related but distinct Eurasian species, Martes martes. Martes americana is found throughout Canada and parts of the northern United States including Alaska. It is a long, slender-bodied marten, with fur ranging from yellowish to brown to near black. It may be confused with the fisher (Pekania pennanti), but the marten is lighter in color and smaller. Identification of the marten is further eased by a characteristic bib that is a distinctly different color from the body. Sexual dimorphism is pronounced, with males being much larger.

These martens are omnivorous and their diet varies by season, but they rely chiefly on small mammals, such as voles. They are solitary except during the midsummer breeding season. Embryonic implantation is delayed until late winter, however, with a litter of one to five kits born the following spring. Young stay with the mother in a constructed den until the fall, and they reach sexual maturity by one year old.

Their sable-like fur made them a thoroughly trapped species during the height of the North American fur trade. Trapping peaked in 1820, and populations were depleted until after the turn of the century. Populations have rebounded since, with them being considered a species of least concern by the IUCN, but they remain extirpated from some areas of the Northeast, and of the seven subspecies, one is threatened.

== Taxonomy ==
The Pacific marten (Martes caurina) was formerly thought to be conspecific, but genetic studies support it being a distinct species from M. americana. The Pacific marten has a more westerly distribution, hence its common name, ranging into the Pacific Northwest and south to Northern California. Additionally, the Pacific marten has a longer snout and broader cranium than the American marten, and slightly different variations in coat color.

Seven regional subspecies have been recognized for M. americana, none of which are distinct morphologically; typically, subspecies taxonomy is only emphasized for work involving those regional groups of a species and their unique set of needs or threats (as opposed to the species' complete range).

- Martes americana abieticola (Preble)
- M. a. abietinoides (Gray)
- M. a. actuosa (Osgood)
- M. a. americana (Turton)
- M. a. atrata (Bangs)
- M. a. brumalis (Bangs)
- M. a. kenaiensis (Elliot)

A fossil species (originating from the Late Pleistocene to Early Holocene) known as Martes nobilis is considered synonymous with M. americana.

== Distribution and habitat ==
The American marten is broadly distributed in northern North America. From north to south, its range extends from the northern limit of the treeline in arctic Alaska and Canada south to New York. From east to west, its distribution extends from Newfoundland to western Alaska, and southwest to the Pacific coast of Canada. The American marten's distribution is vast and continuous in Canada and Alaska. In the northeastern and midwestern United States, its distribution is limited to mountain ranges that provide preferred habitats. Over time, the distribution of American martens has contracted and expanded regionally, with local extirpations and successful recolonizations occurring in the Great Lakes region and some parts of the Northeast. The American marten has been reintroduced in several areas where extinction occurred, although in some cases, it has instead been introduced into the range of the Pacific marten. It is considered extirpated from Pennsylvania, Maryland, Massachusetts, West Virginia, Ohio, New Jersey, and Illinois.

Martens were once thought to live only in old conifer (evergreen) forests, but further study shows that martens live in both old and young deciduous (leafy) and conifer forests as well as mixed forests, including in Alaska and Canada, and south into northern New England, and the Adirondacks in New York. Groups of martens also live in the Midwest, in the Upper Peninsula of Michigan, Wisconsin, and much of Minnesota. Trapping and destruction of forest habitat have reduced its numbers, but it is still much more abundant than the larger fisher. The Newfoundland subspecies (M. a. atrata) is considered to be threatened.

A broad, natural hybrid zone between the Pacific and American martens is known to exist in the Columbia Mountains, as well as Kupreanof and Kuiu Islands in Alaska. Several translocations of American martens have been made without regard to the Pacific marten, threatening the latter species. On Dall Island, American martens have been introduced and are hybridizing with the native Pacific marten population, which may put them at risk. On many islands throughout the Alexander Archipelago, American martens have been introduced and are present, with no sign of the Pacific martens; whether the islands previously had no marten species until American martens were introduced, or whether the Pacific martens existed on those islands previously but were extirpated by the introduced American martens is unknown. In addition, genetic evidence of introgression with American martens is present in other parts of the Pacific marten's range, which is likely also a consequence of American marten introductions.

=== Home range ===
Compared to other carnivores, the American marten population density is low for their body size. One review reports population densities ranging from 0.4 to 2.5 individuals/km^{2}. Population density may vary annually or seasonally. Low population densities have been associated with a low abundance of prey species.

Home range size of the American marten is extremely variable, with differences attributable to sex, year, geographic area, prey availability, cover type, quality or availability, habitat fragmentation, reproductive status, resident status, predation, and population density. Home range size does not appear to be related to body size for either sex. Home range size ranged from 0.04 sq mi (0.1 km^{2}) in Maine to 6.1 sq mi (15.7 km^{2}) in Minnesota for males, and 0.04 sq mi (0.1 km^{2}) in Maine to 3.0 sq mi (7.7 km^{2}) in Wisconsin for females.

Males generally exhibit larger home ranges than females, which some authors suggest is due to more specific habitat requirements of females (e.g., denning or prey requirements) that limit their ability to shift home range. However, unusually large home ranges were observed for four females in two studies (Alaska and Quebec).

Home ranges are indicated by scent marking. American marten male pelts often show signs of scarring on the head and shoulders, suggesting intrasexual aggression that may be related to home range maintenance. Home range overlap is generally minimal or nonexistent between adult males but may occur between males and females, adult males and juveniles, and between females.

Several authors have reported that home range boundaries appear to coincide with topographical or geographical features. In south-central Alaska, home range boundaries included creeks and a major river. In an area burned 8 years previously in interior Alaska, home range boundaries coincided with transition areas between riparian and nonriparian habitats.

== Description ==
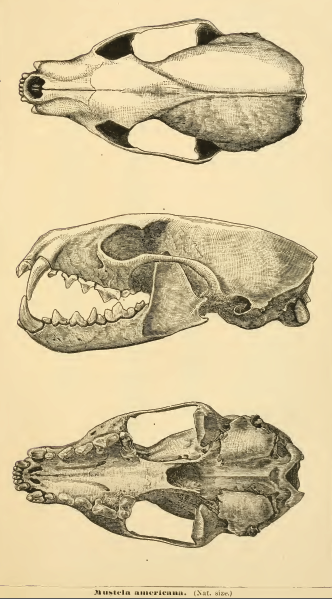
Skull

The American marten is a long, slender-bodied weasel about the size of a mink, with relatively large, rounded ears, short limbs, and a bushy tail. It has a roughly triangular head and sharp nose. Its long, silky fur ranges in color from pale yellowish buff to tawny brown to almost black. The head is usually lighter than the rest of its body, while the tail and legs are darker. The American marten usually has a characteristic throat and chest bib ranging in color from pale straw to vivid orange. Sexual dimorphism is pronounced, with males averaging about 15% larger than females in length and as much as 65% larger in body weight.

Total length ranges from 1.5 to 2.2 ft (0.5–0.7 m), with a tail length of 5.4 to 6.4 in (135–160 mm), Adult weight ranges from 1.1 to 3.1 lb (0.5–1.4 kg) and varies by age and location. Other than size, sexes are similar in appearance. American martens have limited body-fat reserves, experience high mass-specific heat loss, and have limited fasting endurance. In winter, individuals may go into shallow torpor daily to reduce heat loss.

== Behavior ==
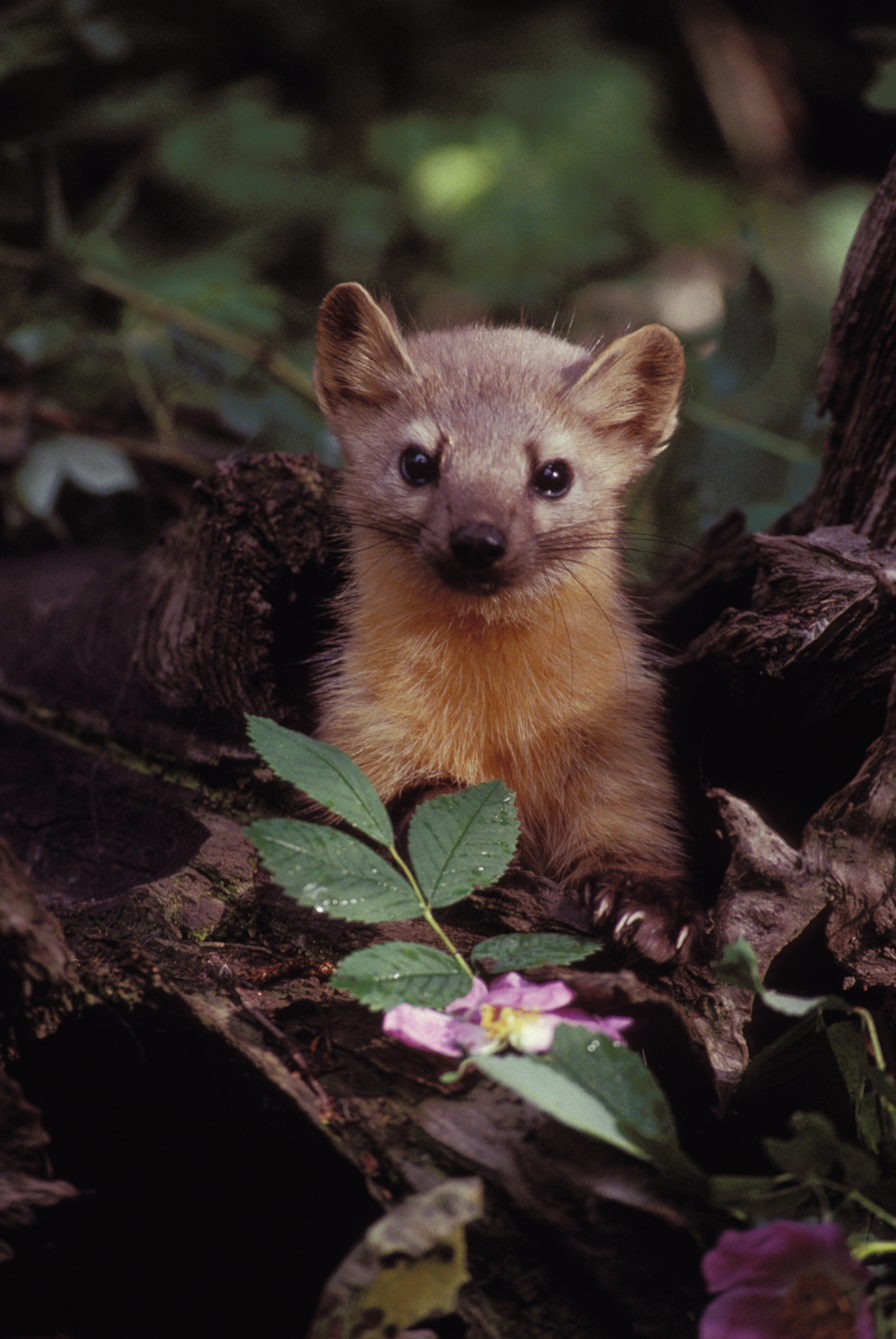
American marten displaying its characteristic light-colored throat

American marten activity patterns vary by region, though in general, activity is greater in summer than in winter. They may be active as much as 60% of the day in summer, but as little as 16% of the day in winter In north-central Ontario, individuals were active about 10 to 16 hours a day in all seasons except late winter, when activity was reduced to about 5 hours a day. In south-central Alaska, American martens were more active in autumn (66% active) than in late winter and early spring (43% active).

The American marten may be nocturnal or diurnal. Variability in daily activity patterns has been linked to activity of major prey species, foraging efficiency, sex, reducing exposure to extreme temperatures, season, and timber harvest. In south-central Alaska, they were nocturnal in autumn, with strong individual variability in diel activity in late winter. Activity occurred throughout the day in late winter and early spring.

Daily distance traveled may vary by age, sex, habitat quality, season, prey availability, traveling conditions, weather, and physiological condition of the individual. One marten in south-central Alaska repeatedly traveled 7 to 9 miles (11–14 km) overnight to move between two areas of home range focal activity. One individual in central Idaho moved as much as 9 miles (14 km) a day in winter, but movements were largely confined to a 1,280-acre (518 ha) area. Juvenile American martens in east-central Alaska traveled significantly farther each day than adults (1.4 mi (2.2 km) vs. 0.9 mi (1.4 km)).

=== Weather factors ===
The weather may affect American marten activity, resting site use, and prey availability. Individuals may become inactive during storms or extreme cold. In interior Alaska, a decrease in above-the-snow activity occurred when ambient temperatures fell below −4°F (−20°C).

A snowy habitat in many parts of the range of the American marten provides thermal protection and opportunities for foraging and resting. They may travel extensively under the snowpack. Subnivean travel routes were more than 33 ft (10 m) on the Upper Peninsula of Michigan.

American martens are well adapted to snow. On the Kenai Peninsula, individuals navigated through deep snow regardless of depth, with tracks rarely sinking more than 2 in(5 cm) into the snowpack. Snowfall patterns may affect distribution, with the presence of American martens linked to deep snow areas. Where deep snow accumulates, American martens prefer cover types that prevent snow from packing hard and have structures near the ground that provide access to subnivean sites. While they select habitats with deep snow, they may concentrate activity in patches with relatively shallow snow.

== Reproduction ==
=== Breeding ===
American martens reach sexual maturity by 1 year of age, but effective breeding may not occur before 2 years of age. In captivity, 15-year-old females bred successfully. In the wild, 12-year-old females were reproductive.

Adults are generally solitary except during the breeding season. They are polygamous, and females may have multiple periods of estrus. Females enter estrus in July or August, with courtship lasting about 15 days. Embryonic implantation is delayed until late winter, with active gestation lasting about 2 months. Females give birth in late March or April to a litter ranging from one to five kits. Annual reproductive output is low according to predictions based on body size. Fecundity varies by age and year and may be related to food abundance.

=== Denning behavior ===
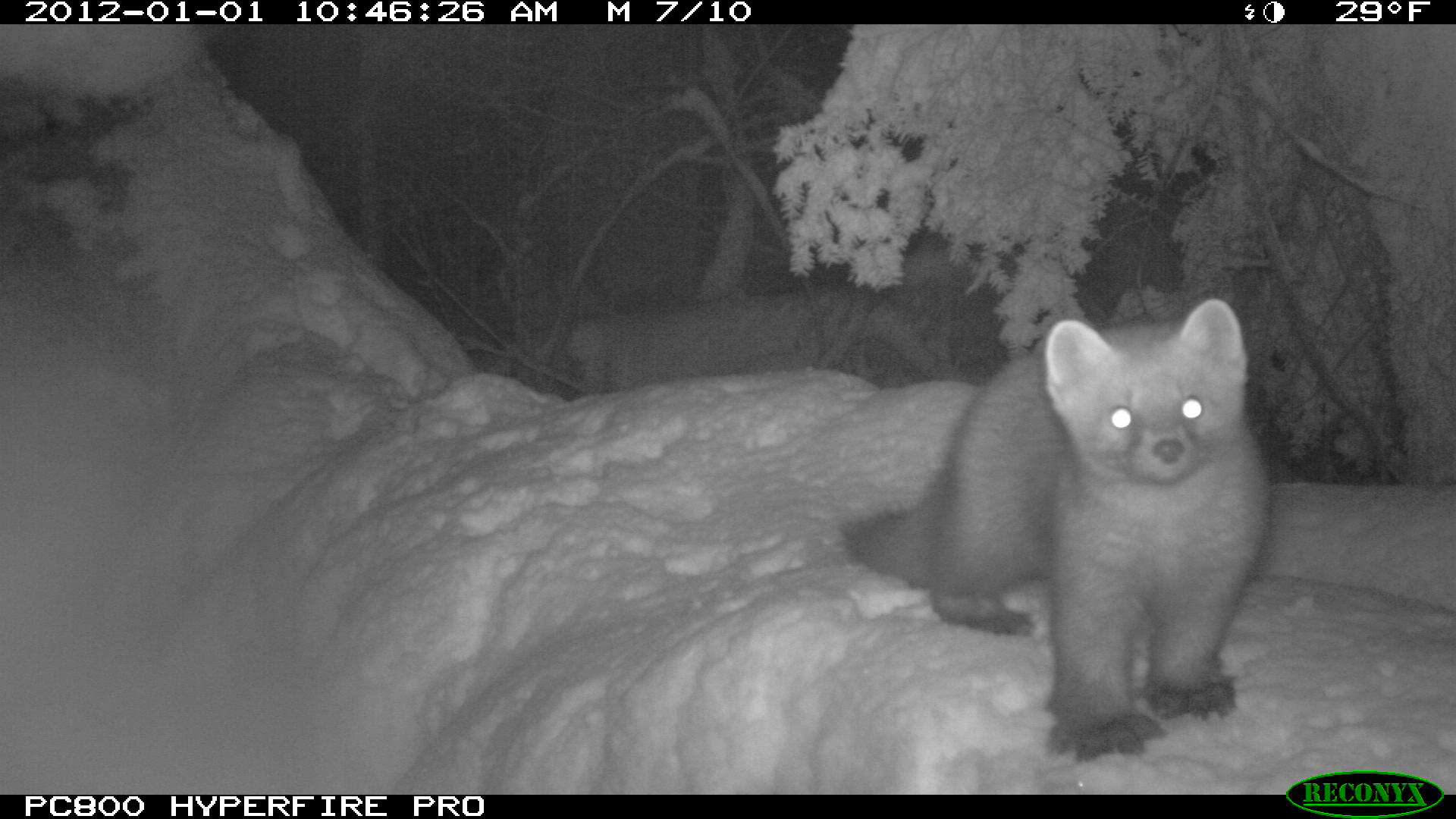
In Sitka, Alaska

Females use dens to give birth and to shelter kits. Dens are classified as either natal dens, where parturition takes place, or maternal dens, where females move their kits after birth. American marten females use a variety of structures for natal and maternal denning, including the branches, cavities, or broken tops of live trees, snags, stumps, logs, woody debris piles, rock piles, and red squirrel (Tamiasciurus hudsonicus) nests or middens. Females prepare a natal den by lining a cavity with grass, moss, and leaves. They frequently move kits to new maternal dens once kits are 7–13 weeks old. Most females spend more than 50% of their time attending dens in both preweaning and weaning periods, with less time spent at dens as kits aged. Paternal care has not been documented.

=== Development of young ===
Weaning occurs at 42 days. Young kits emerge from dens around 50 days old, but may be moved by their mother before this. In northwestern Maine, kits were active but poorly coordinated at 7 to 8 weeks, gaining coordination by 12 to 15 weeks. Young reach adult body weight around 3 months old.

Kits generally stay in the company of their mother through the end of their first summer, and most disperse in the fall. The timing of juvenile dispersal is not consistent throughout American marten's distribution, ranging from early August to October. In south-central Yukon, young of the year dispersed from mid-July to mid-September, coinciding with the onset of female estrus. Observations from Yukon suggest that juveniles may disperse in early spring.

== Food habits ==
American martens are opportunistic predators, influenced by local and seasonal abundance and availability of potential prey. They require about 80 kcal/day while at rest, the equivalent of about three voles (Microtus, Myodes, and Phenacomys spp.). Voles dominate diets throughout the American marten's geographic range, though larger prey, particularly snowshoe hares and American red squirrels, may be important, particularly in winter. Red-backed voles (Myodes spp.) are generally taken in proportion to their availability, while meadow voles (Microtus spp.) are taken preferably in most areas. Deer mice (Peromyscus maniculatus), shrews (Soricidae), birds, and carrion are generally eaten less than expected, but may be important food items in areas lacking alternative prey species.

American martens' diet may shift seasonally or annually. Generally, diet is more diverse in summer than winter, with summer diets containing more fruit, nuts, vegetation, and insects. Diet is generally more diverse with the American marten's distribution compared to Pacific marten's, though high diversity occurs in the Pacific states. American martens exhibit the least diet diversity in the subarctic, though diversity may also be low in areas where the diet is dominated by large prey species (e.g., snowshoe hares or red squirrels).

American martens may be important seed dispersers; seeds generally pass through the animal intact and are likely germinable. One study from Chichagof Island, southeast Alaska, found that Alaska blueberry (Vaccinium alaskensis) and oval-leaf huckleberry (V. ovalifolium) seeds had higher germination rates after passing through the gut of American martens compared to seeds that dropped from the parent plant. Analyses of American marten movement and seed-passage rates suggested that American martens could disperse seeds long distances; 54% of the distances analyzed were more than 0.3-mi (0.5 km).

== Mortality ==
American martens alert to the presence of a dog.

=== Lifespan ===
American martens in captivity may live for 15 years. The oldest individual documented in the wild was 14.5 years old. Survival rates vary by geographic region, exposure to trapping, habitat quality, and age. In an unharvested population in northeastern Oregon, the probability of survival of an American marten 9 months or less old was 0.55 for 1 year, 0.37 for 2 years, 0.22 for 3 years, and 0.15 for 4 years. The mean annual probability of survival was 0.63 for 4 years. In a harvested population in east-central Alaska, annual adult survival rates ranged from 0.51 to 0.83 over 3 years of study. Juvenile survival rates were lower, ranging from 0.26 to 0.50. In Newfoundland, annual adult survival was 0.83. Survival of juveniles from October to April was 0.76 in a protected population, but 0.51 in areas open to snaring and trapping. In western Quebec, natural mortality rates were higher in clear-cut areas than in unlogged areas.

=== Predators ===
American martens are vulnerable to predation from raptors and other carnivores. The threat of predation may be an important factor shaping American marten habitat preferences, a hypothesis inferred from their avoidance of open areas and behavioral observations of the European pine marten (Martes martes). Specific predators vary by geographic region. On Newfoundland, red foxes (Vulpes vulpes) were the most frequent predator, though coyote (Canis latrans) and conspecifics were also responsible for some deaths. In deciduous forests in northeastern British Columbia, most predation was attributed to raptors. Throughout the distribution of American marten, other predators include the great horned owl (Bubo virginianus), bald eagle (Haliaeetus leucocephalus), golden eagle (Aquila chrysaetos), bobcat (Lynx rufus) Canada lynx (L. canadensis), mountain lion (Puma concolor), fisher (Pekania pennanti), wolverine (Gulo gulo), grizzly bear (Ursus arctos horribilis), American black bear (U. americanus), and grey wolf (C. lupus).

=== Hunting ===
The fur of the American marten is shiny and luxuriant, resembling that of the closely related sable (Martes zibellina). At the turn of the 20th century, the American marten population was depleted due to the fur trade. The Hudson's Bay Company traded in pelts from this species among others. Numerous protection measures and reintroduction efforts have allowed the population to increase, but deforestation is still a problem for the marten in much of its habitat. They are trapped for their fur in all but a few states and provinces where they occur. The highest annual take in North America was 272,000 animals in 1820.

Trapping is a major source of American marten mortality in some populations and may account for up to 90% of all deaths in some areas. Overharvesting has contributed to local extirpations. Trapping may affect population density, sex ratios, and age structure. Juveniles are more vulnerable to trapping than adults, and males are more vulnerable than females. American martens are particularly vulnerable to trapping mortality in industrial forests.

=== Other ===
Other sources of mortality include drowning, starvation, exposure, choking, and infections associated with injury. During live trapping, high mortality may occur if individuals become wet in cold weather.

American martens host several internal and external parasites, including helminths, fleas (Siphonaptera), and ticks (Ixodida). American martens in central Ontario carried both toxoplasmosis and Aleutian disease, but neither affliction was suspected to cause significant mortality. High mortality in Newfoundland was caused by encephalitis.

== Habitat reintroduction ==
The American marten has been put on track to be reintroduced into Pennsylvania by 2032.
