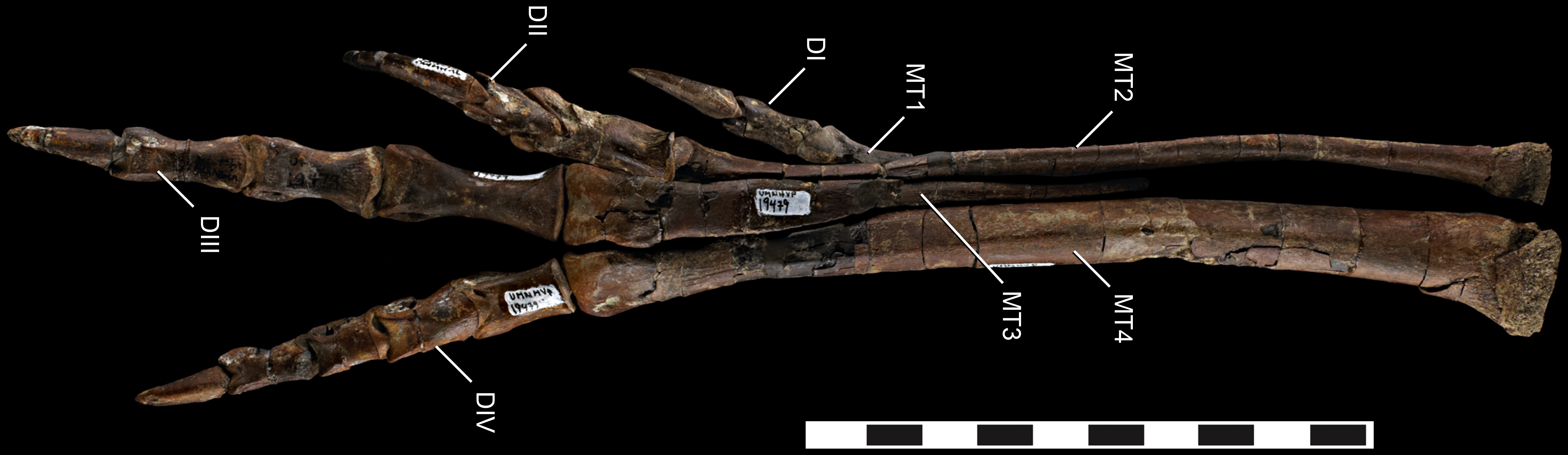
- Articulated foot

Scientific classification
- Kingdom: Animalia
- Phylum: Chordata
- Class: Reptilia
- Clade: Dinosauria
- Clade: Saurischia
- Clade: Theropoda
- Family: †Troodontidae
- Genus: †Talos; Zanno et al., 2011
- Species: †T. sampsoni

Binomial name
- †Talos sampsoni Zanno et al., 2011

= Talos sampsoni =

Talos sampsoni Temporal range: Campanian, 76 Ma

Extinct species of dinosaur

Talos is an extinct genus of troodontid theropod dinosaur that lived during the late Cretaceous period (late Campanian, about 76 million years ago) in the geographic area that is now Utah, United States. It is known from a single species, Talos sampsoni.

== Discovery ==
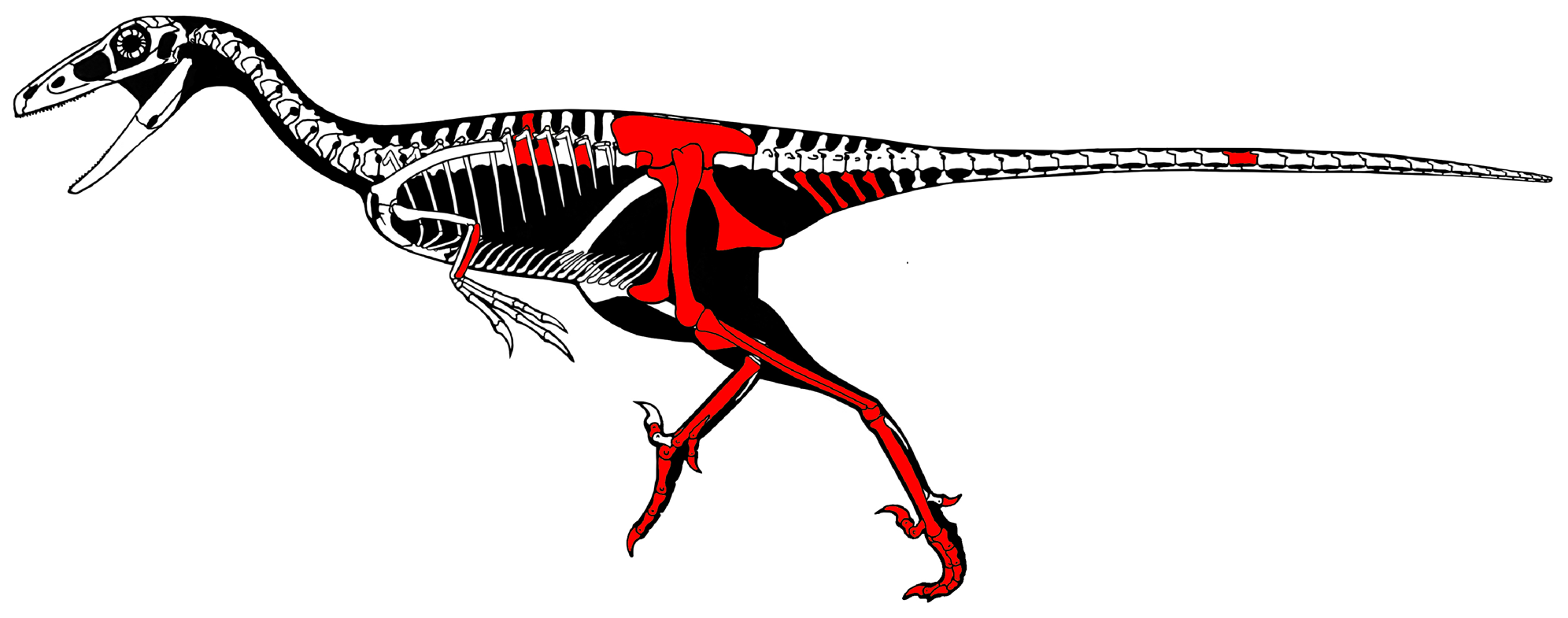
Skeletal restoration of the holotype by Scott Hartman, with known parts shown in red

Talos is known only from the holotype specimen UMNH VP 19479, a partial postcranial skeleton of a subadult individual including the hindlimbs, pelvis, vertebral fragments, chevrons and the left ulna. It was discovered and collected in 2008 by M. J. Knell during the Kaiparowits Basin Project, initiated by the University of Utah in 2000, from the Kaiparowits Formation within the Grand Staircase–Escalante National Monument. It was first named by Lindsay E. Zanno, David J. Varricchio, Patrick M. O'Connor, Alan L. Titus, and Michael J. Knell in 2011 and the type species is Talos sampsoni. The generic name comes from Talos, a giant bronze automaton in Greek mythology and is intended to be a pun on the English word talon. The specific name honors television paleontologist Dr. Scott D. Sampson for researching and collecting fossils during the Kaiparowits Basin Project.

== Description ==
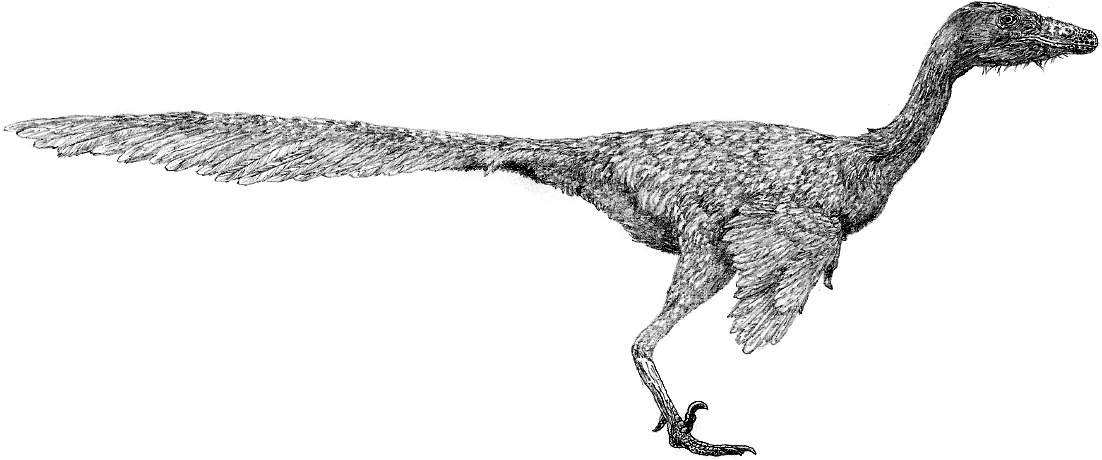
Restoration.

Talos is a troodontid, a group of small, bird-like, gracile maniraptorans. All troodontids have many unique features of the skull, such as closely spaced teeth in the lower jaw, and large numbers of teeth. Troodontids have sickle-claws and raptorial hands, and some of the highest non-avian encephalization quotients, meaning they were behaviourally advanced and had keen senses. Talos is approximately 2 metres (6.6 ft) in length, and its weight has been estimated at thirty-eight kilograms. Talos had a sickle claw. That of the specimen was damaged during life, possibly in an attack on prey.

In 2011 Talos was assigned to the Troodontidae. A cladistic analysis indicated it formed a clade of derived troodontids together with Byronosaurus, Saurornithoides, Zanabazar and Troodon.

== Paleoecology ==
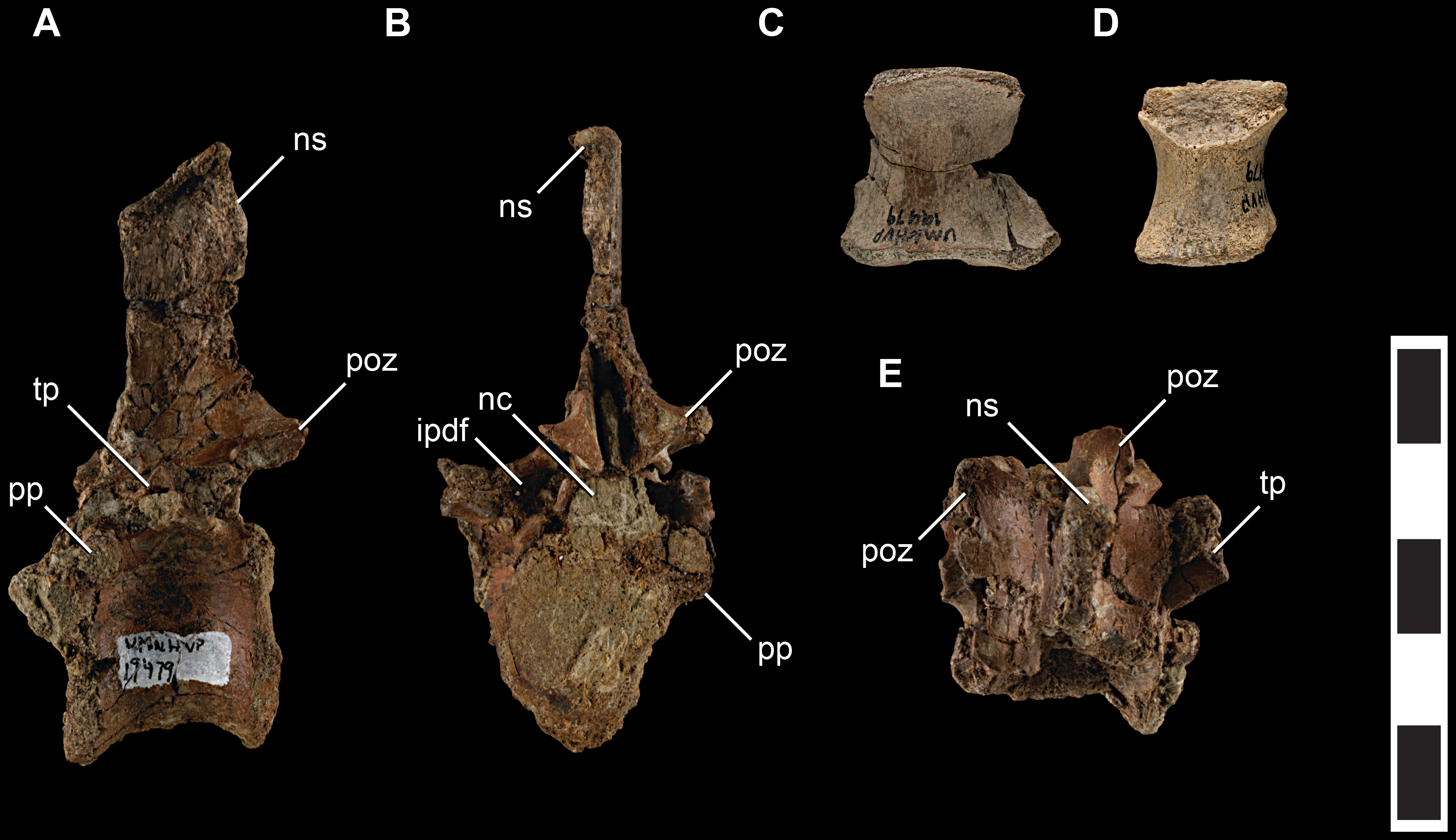
Vertebrae

=== Habitat ===
The only known specimen of Talos was recovered at the Kaiparowits Formation, in southern Utah. Argon-argon radiometric dating indicates that the Kaiparowits Formation was deposited between 76.1 and 74.0 million years ago, during the Campanian stage of the Late Cretaceous period. During the Late Cretaceous period, the site of the Kaiparowits Formation was located near the western shore of the Western Interior Seaway, a large inland sea that split North America into two landmasses, Laramidia to the west and Appalachia to the east. The plateau where dinosaurs lived was an ancient floodplain dominated by large channels and abundant wetland peat swamps, ponds and lakes, and was bordered by highlands. The climate was wet and humid, and supported an abundant and diverse range of organisms. This formation contains one of the best and most continuous records of Late Cretaceous terrestrial life in the world.

=== Paleofauna ===
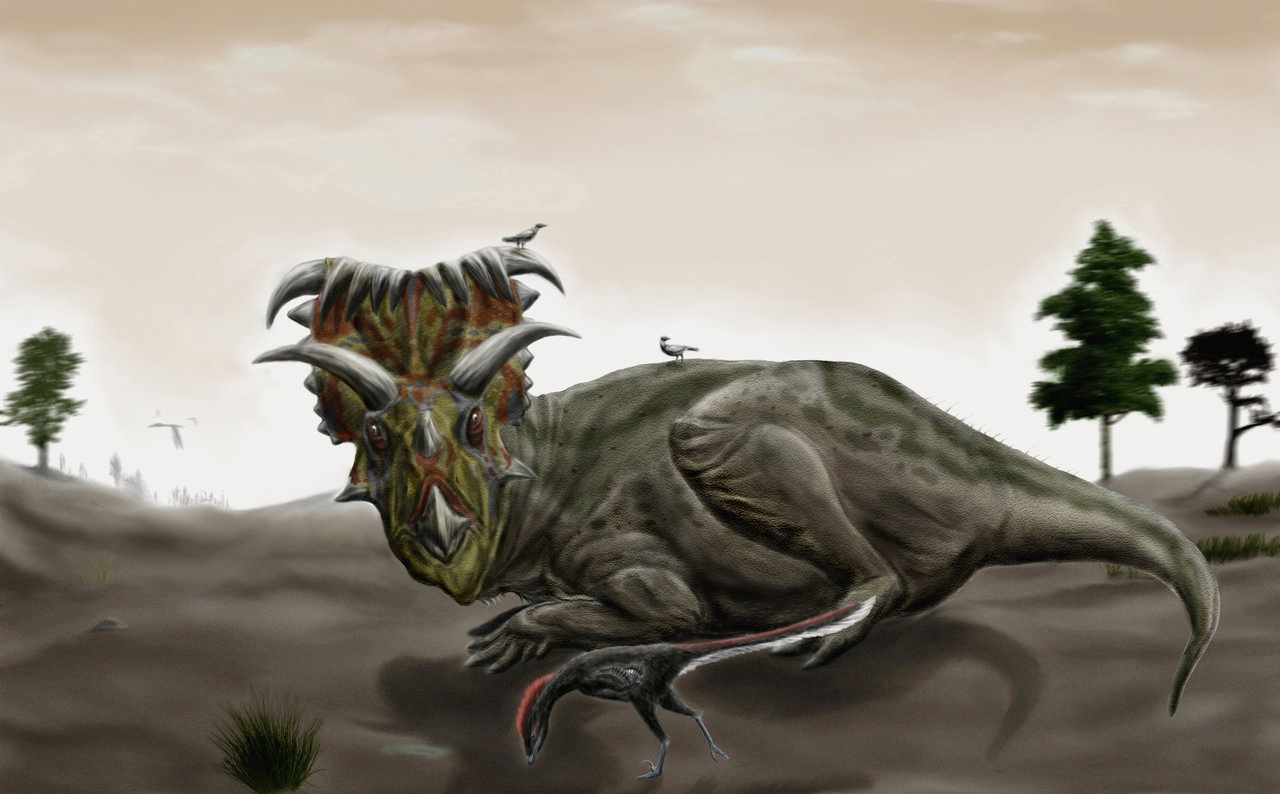
A Kosmoceratops disturbed from its rest by a wandering Talos

Talos shared its paleoenvironment with theropods such as dromaeosaurids, ornithomimids like Ornithomimus velox, tyrannosaurids like Teratophoneus, armored ankylosaurids such as Akainacephalus johnsoni, the duckbilled hadrosaurs Parasaurolophus cyrtocristatus and Gryposaurus monumentensis, the ceratopsians Utahceratops gettyi, Nasutoceratops titusi and Kosmoceratops richardsoni and the oviraptorosaurian Hagryphus giganteus. Paleofauna present in the Kaiparowits Formation included chondrichthyans (sharks and rays), frogs, salamanders, turtles, lizards and crocodilians. A variety of early mammals were present including multituberculates, marsupials, and insectivorans.

== See also ==
- Timeline of troodontid research
