= Transverse fissure =

Transverse fissure can refer to:

- Porta hepatis or transverse fissure of liver
- Horizontal fissure of right lung (or 'horizontal fissure')
- Horizontal fissure of cerebellum
