= Horizontal =

Horizontal may refer to:

- Horizontal plane, in astronomy, geography, geometry and other sciences and contexts
- Horizontal coordinate system, in astronomy
- Horizontalism, in monetary circuit theory
- Horizontalism, in sociology
- Horizontal market, in microeconomics
- Horizontal (Bee Gees album), 1968, or the title song
- Horizontal (Moodswings album), 2002

== See also ==
- Horizontal and vertical
- Horizontal and vertical (disambiguation)
- Horizontal fissure (disambiguation), anatomical features
- Horizontal bar, an apparatus used by male gymnasts in artistic gymnastics
- Vertical (disambiguation)
