= Horizontal fissure =

Horizontal fissure may refer to:

- Horizontal fissure of cerebellum
- Horizontal fissure of right lung

== See also ==
- Fissure (anatomy)
- Sulcus (morphology)
