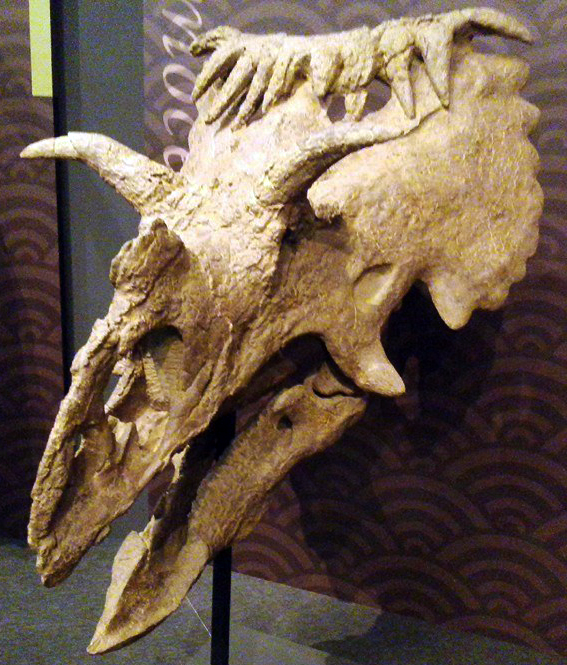
- Skull cast with reconstructed predentary bone, right horn, and left part of face

Scientific classification
- Kingdom: Animalia
- Phylum: Chordata
- Class: Reptilia
- Clade: Dinosauria
- Clade: †Ornithischia
- Clade: †Ceratopsia
- Family: †Ceratopsidae
- Subfamily: †Chasmosaurinae
- Genus: †Kosmoceratops; Sampson et al., 2010
- Species: †K. richardsoni

Binomial name
- †Kosmoceratops richardsoni Sampson et al., 2010

= Kosmoceratops =

Kosmoceratops Temporal range: Late Cretaceous, 76–75.9 Ma

Dinosaur genus from the Late Cretaceous period

Kosmoceratops (/ˌkɒzməˈsɛrətɒps/) is a genus of ceratopsid dinosaur that lived in North America about 76–75.9 million years ago during the Late Cretaceous period. Specimens were discovered in Utah in the Kaiparowits Formation of the Grand Staircase–Escalante National Monument in 2006 and 2007, including an adult skull and postcranial skeleton and partial subadults. In 2010, the adult was made the holotype of the new genus and species Kosmoceratops richardsoni; the generic name means "ornate horned face", and the specific name honors Scott Richardson, who found the specimens. The find was part of a spate of ceratopsian discoveries in the early 21st century, and Kosmoceratops was considered significant due to its elaborate skull ornamentation.

Kosmoceratops had an estimated length of 4.5 m (15 ft) and a weight of 1.2 t (1.3 short tons). As a ceratopsid, it would have been quadrupedal with a heavily constructed skeleton. It had a triangular beak with a pointed tip and a blade-like nasal horn with a flattened upper portion. While the horns above the eyes were oriented forwards or hindwards in most of its relatives, the horns of Kosmoceratops pointed up and to the sides, then downwards, ending in pointed tips. The neck frill was short from front to back, with small parietal fenestrae (openings through the frill), and ten hook-like epiossifications on the hind margin, with eight curving forwards and two curving to the sides. With fifteen well-developed horns and horn-like structures, it possessed the most ornate skull of any known dinosaur species. Kosmoceratops was a chasmosaurine ceratopsid and was originally suggested to be closely related to Vagaceratops (which also had forward-curving epiossifications on the back of the frill) but this has been debated, some authors finding the latter closer to Chasmosaurus. Kosmoceratops is also considered closely related to Spiclypeus, which had a similar frill.

Studies of bone histology show that Kosmoceratops grew rapidly and had an elevated metabolism, similar to modern birds and mammals. The teeth of ceratopsids were adapted to processing fibrous plants; coprolites (fossilized dung) from the Kaiparowits Formation that contain wood may have been produced by ceratopsids. The functions of ceratopsian frills and horns have been debated, and include display, combat, and species recognition. The Kaiparowits Formation dates to the late Campanian age and was deposited on Laramidia, an island continent, when North America was divided at the center by the Western Interior Seaway. This environment was dominated by wetlands and supported a diverse fauna, including dinosaurs such as the chasmosaurine Utahceratops. Based in part on the relationship between Kosmoceratops and other chasmosaurines from around the same time, it has been proposed that Laramidia was divided into dinosaur "provinces" with separate endemic species (this interpretation suggests that Kosmoceratops in the south was most closely related to the geographically separated Vagaceratops in the north), but this has been contested.

== Discovery ==
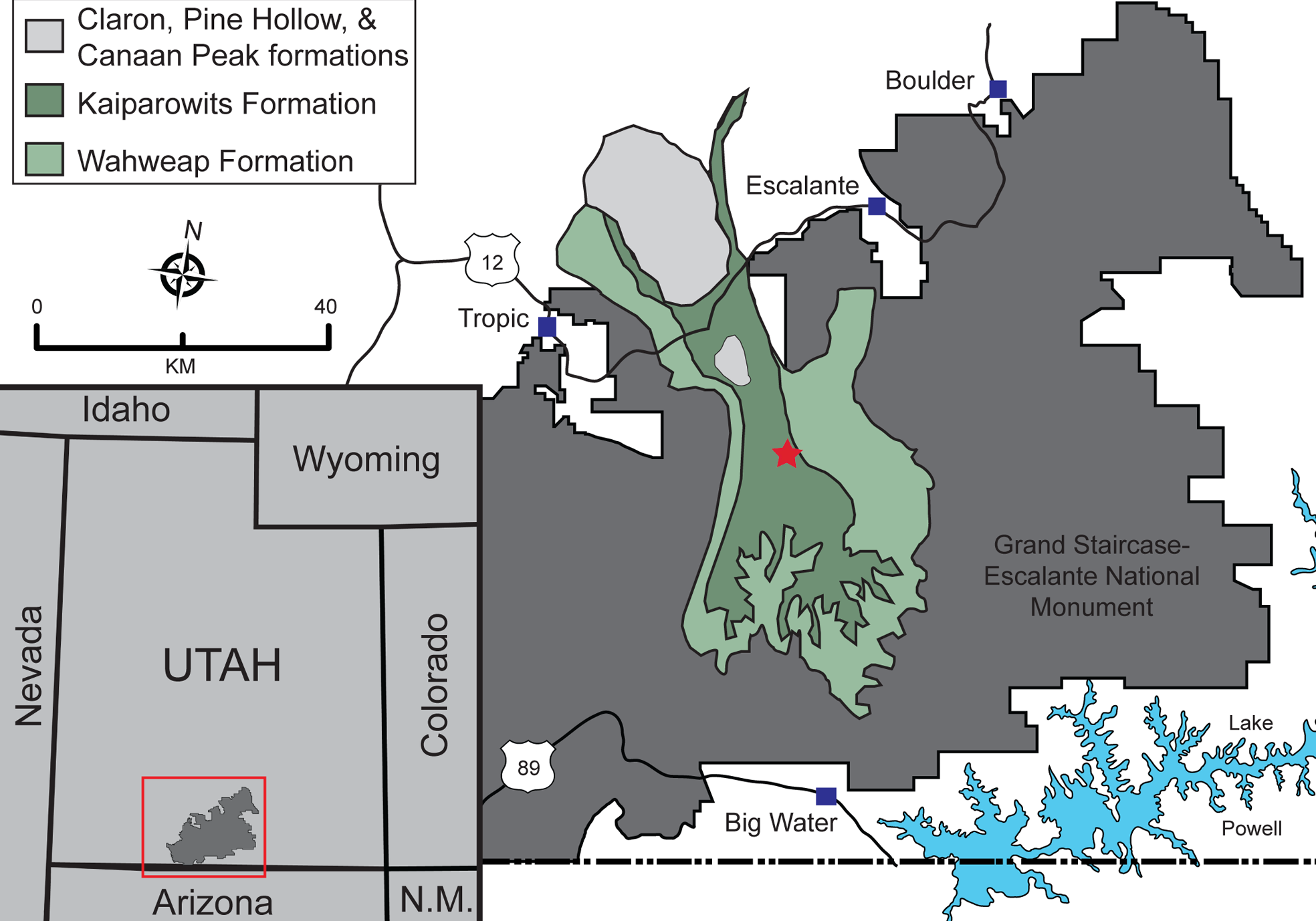
Map of where Kosmoceratops specimens (★) have been found within the Kaiparowits Formation (dark green)

Since 2000, the Natural History Museum of Utah (UMNH) and the Bureau of Land Management have been conducting paleontological surveys of the Kaiparowits Formation at the Grand Staircase–Escalante National Monument (GSENM) in southern Utah. This national monument was established in 1996 in part for the preservation and study of its fossils, and the surveys there have yielded a wide array of unique dinosaur fossils. Field crews from other institutions have also participated, and the collaborative effort has been called the Kaiparowits Basin Project. Among the discoveries made were three new ceratopsian (horned dinosaur) taxa, one of which was identified from two localities (UMNH Locality VP 890 and 951) discovered by volunteer field crew member Scott Richardson during the field seasons of 2006 and 2007. It was preliminarily referred to as "Kaiparowits new taxon A" and identified as a chasmosaurine ceratopsid in a 2010 book. Prior to this project, the only ceratopsian remains found at the formation were uninformative, isolated teeth. Excavated fossils were transported to the UMNH, where the blocks were prepared by volunteers with pneumatic air scribes and needles and subsequently reassembled.

In 2010, the paleontologist Scott D. Sampson and colleagues named the new genus and species Kosmoceratops richardsoni, specimen UMNH VP 17000 (from Locality VP 890) being the holotype. The generic name is derived from the Ancient Greek kosmos, which means "ornamented", and ceratops, which means "horned face". The specific name honors Richardson, who found the holotype and many other fossils at GSENM. The full name can be translated as "ornate horned face of Richardson". The holotype includes a nearly complete adult skull that is missing the predentary bone (the frontmost bone of the lower jaw) and a small part of the left side of the face and neck frill (parts of the jugal, squamosal, and parietal bones), and the snout is bent to the right due to postmortem (after death) distortion. A considerable portion of the axial skeleton (such as vertebrae and ribs) was found associated with the skull, as well as part of the pelvic girdle and a limb. 45 percent of the postcranial skeleton was thought to be preserved, most of which was still under preparation by 2010. Assigned specimens include UMNH VP 16878, a disarticulated skull of a subadult (between juvenile and adult) about half the size of the adult, missing the premaxilla, rostral, and predentary bones, and specimen UMNH VP 21339, a disarticulated subadult or adult. In all, four specimens were reportedly found.

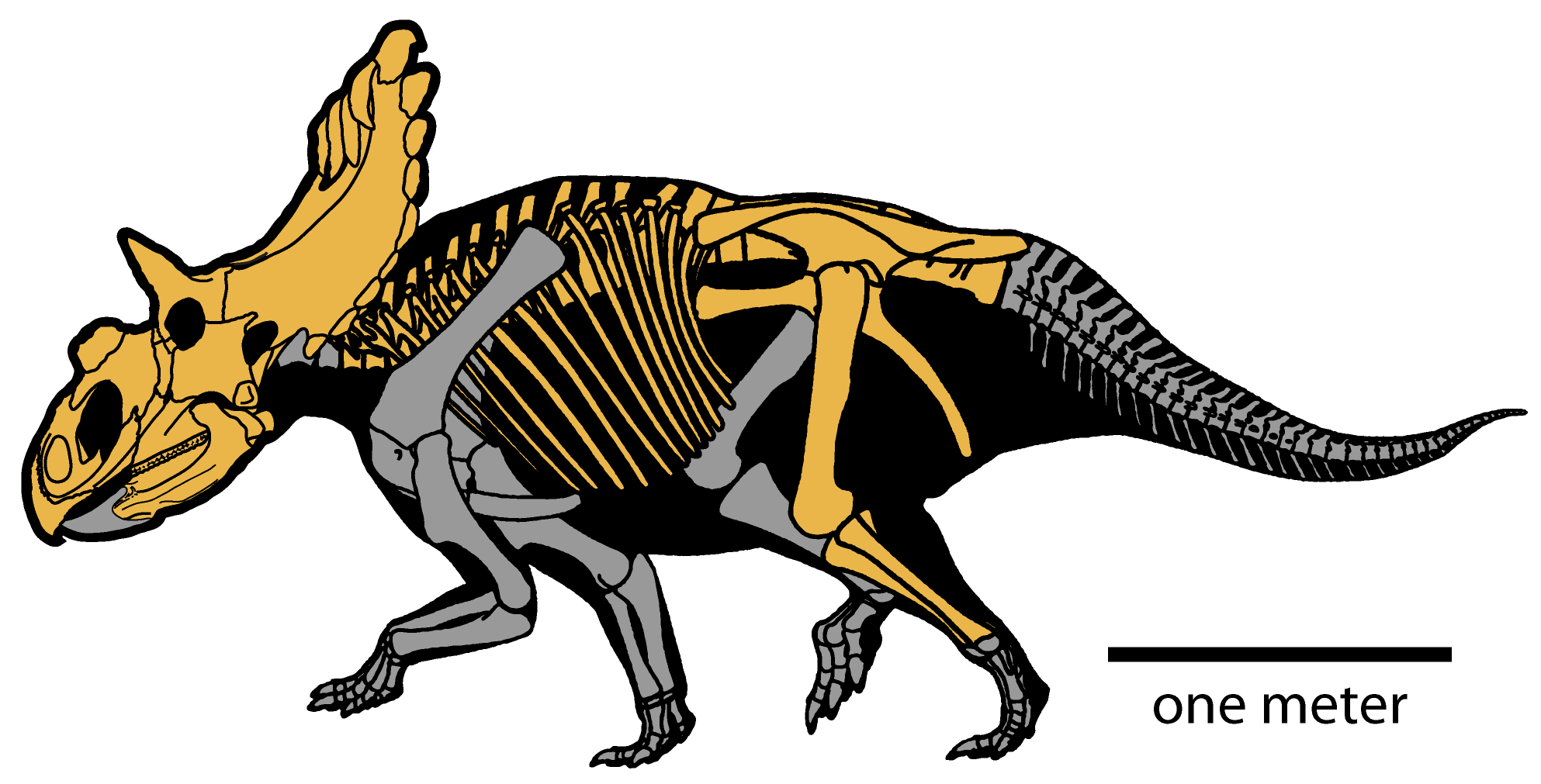
Skeletal diagram showing known elements in orange

The describers of Kosmoceratops named the new chasmosaurine genera Utahceratops (also from the Kaiparowits Formation) and Vagaceratops (from the Dinosaur Park Formation, whose sole species, C. irvinensis, was formerly placed in Chasmosaurus) in the same article. These genera, which were considered unusual compared to typical members of their group, were part of a spate of ceratopsian discoveries in the early 21st century, when many new taxa were named (a 2013 study stated that half of all valid genera were named since 2003, and the decade has been called a "ceratopsid renaissance"). The main focus of the article by Sampson and colleagues was how these three ceratopsian genera provided new evidence for reconstructing the paleobiogeography of their time and place. In a 2010 press release announcing the study, Sampson described Kosmoceratops as "one of the most amazing animals known, with a huge skull decorated with an assortment of bony bells and whistles", and considered GSENM "one of the country's last great, largely unexplored dinosaur boneyards".

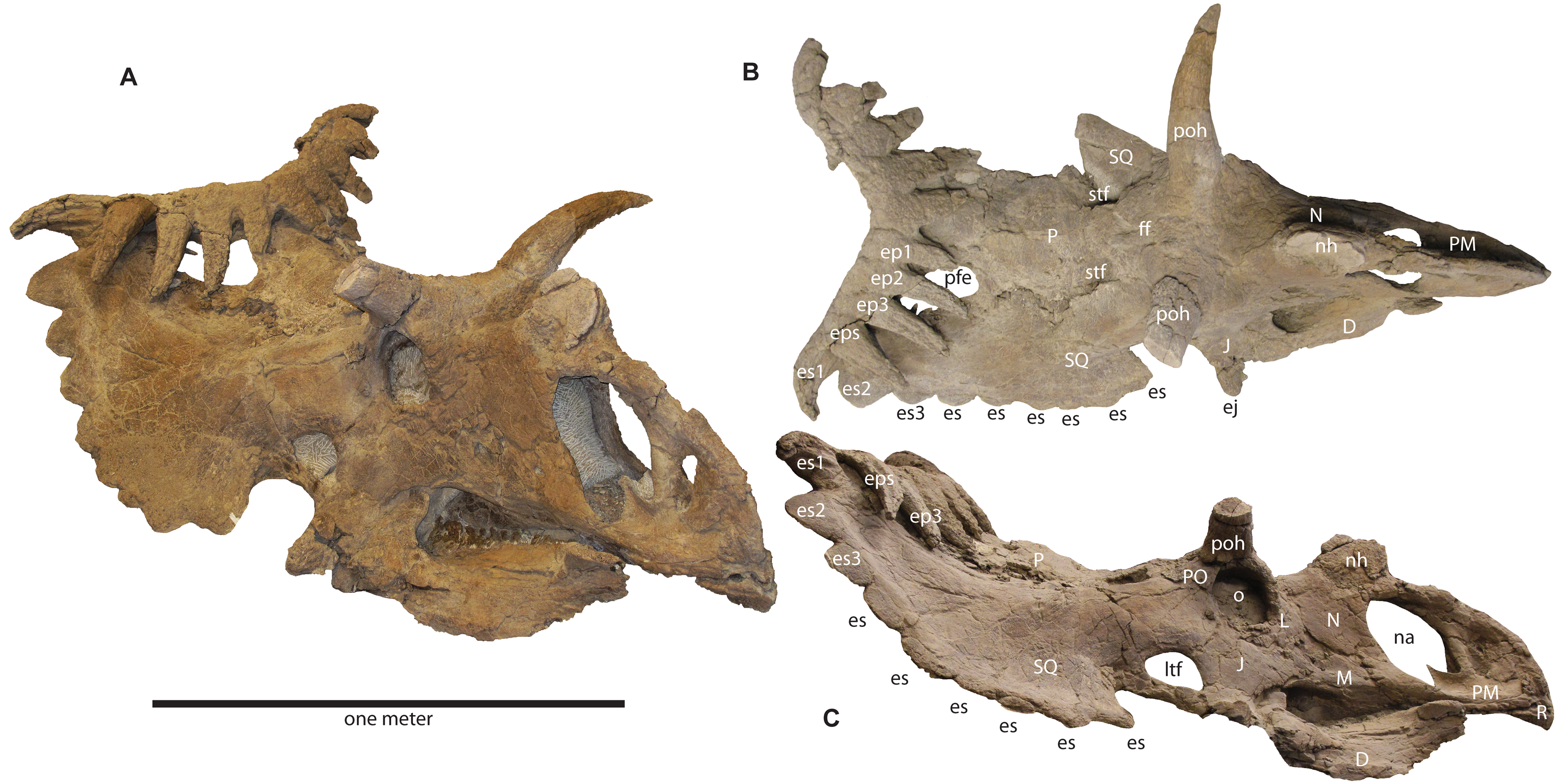
Holotype skull shown in oblique, top, and right side views

In 2017, the US government announced plans to shrink the GSENM (to little over half its size) and Bears Ears monuments to enable coal mining and other energy development on the land, which was the largest reduction of US national monuments in history. Sampson, who had overseen much of the early research at the former monument, expressed fear that such a move would threaten further discoveries. Media outlets stressed the importance of the area's fossil discoveries—including more than 25 new taxa—while some highlighted Kosmoceratops as one of the more significant finds. The US government was subsequently sued by a group of scientists, environmentalists, and Native Americans; in 2021, the monument was restored to its former extent by the new administration.

A partial skull (cataloged as CMN 8801) discovered in 1928 by fossil collector Charles M. Sternberg in the Dinosaur Park Formation of Alberta, Canada, was assigned to Chasmosaurus russelli in 1940, but only to Chasmosaurus in 1995, as the lack of a neck frill prevented the skull from being identified as a particular species. In 2014 (and in 2015, in an article that failed peer review), the paleontologist Nicholas R. Longrich considered the skull similar to Kosmoceratops in features of the snout but differing in the shape of the naris and nasal horn. He therefore proposed that it was a species of Kosmoceratops other than K. richardsoni and assigned it to K. sp. (of uncertain species). He found it premature to name the species because a neck frill is usually necessary to diagnose a ceratopsid species, and only one skull had been described so far, making it difficult to determine the features and range of variation of the species. In 2016, the paleontologist James A. Campbell and colleagues did not support the assignment of specimen CMN 8801 to Kosmoceratops, as they found the features this was based on to be either influenced by taphonomy (changes occurring during decay and fossilization) or to fall within the variation among Chasmosaurus specimens (though they did not assign it to a particular species in the genus). In 2020, the paleontologists Denver W. Fowler and Elizabeth A. Freedman Fowler stated that CMN 8801 may be more reliably assigned when better understanding of the anatomy in the front part of chasmosaurine skulls is reached.

== Description ==
Size compared to a human

Kosmoceratops is estimated to have been 4.5 m (15 ft) long and to have weighed 1.2 t (1.3 short tons). As a ceratopsid, it would have been a quadruped with a heavily constructed skeleton, a large pelvis, and a relatively shortened tail. It had long main tooth rows which formed complex slicing dental batteries containing hundreds of teeth behind an edentulous (toothless) beak. The upper premaxillary beak of Kosmoceratops was triangular, and the frontmost rostral bone was pointed, with a tip that projected forward and downward. The nasal horncore (the bony projection from which the nose horn grew) was unusual among chasmosaurines in that it was blade-like, with a base that was elongated and narrow from side to side, and with a flattened upper portion. The nasal horncore was quadrangular in overall shape and was placed relatively far back on the snout. The naris (bony nostril opening) was different from other ceratopsids in being tall, relatively narrow from front to back, and distinctly ellipse-shaped (rather than near-circular), with a pronounced hindward inclination. The narial strut of the premaxilla (that extended from the bottom of the nasal cavity to the top) was also inclined hindward, a feature also seen in Anchiceratops and Arrhinoceratops, and the narial process that projected backwards and up from the premaxilla was a triangular prong.

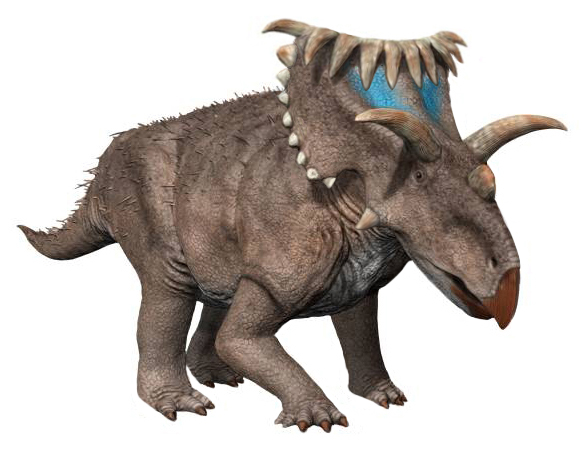
Life restoration

The region around the orbits (eye sockets) was distinctive; while most chasmosaurines had supraorbital horncores (horns above the eyes) that were oriented either forward or hindward, Kosmoceratops and Utahceratops had horncores that were oriented upward and to the sides, superficially similar to those of the modern bison. Compared to the short and blunt horncores of Utahceratops, those of Kosmoceratops were more elongated and slender, curving upward then downward, ending in pointed tips. Right in front and in the middle of the orbits, the skull roof had a pronounced hump, which was present in few other ceratopsids, such as Diabloceratops. As was typical for chasmosaurines other than Chasmosaurus, it had relatively large epijugal ossifications ("cheek horns"). The lateral temporal fenestrae (openings at the sides of the skull) were tall and narrow.

The parietosquamosal neck frill (formed by the parietal and squamosal bones) of Kosmoceratops was very derived (or "advanced"), sharing several features with Vagaceratops only. This included that the frill was short from front to back, with small parietal fenestrae (openings through the frill) placed far back, and the presence of ten hook-like epiossifications (the accessory ossifications that formed the horns and lined the margins of the neck frills in ceratopsids) on the hind margin of the frill. The frill of Kosmoceratops was more extreme than that of Vagaceratops; its width was about double its length (measured across the surface of the bone), with the parietal fenestrae being much smaller and positioned farther back, and it had more elongated and distinct epiossifications on the hind margin. Though chasmosaurines have traditionally been considered the "long-frilled" ceratopsids, Kosmoceratops had the shortest frill relative to its width among chasmosaurines and the smallest parietal fenestrae relative to the total area of the frill of any ceratopsid. The squamosal bones of Kosmoceratops were strongly curved in side view, and their side margins were parallel in top view. The parietal bones did not project past the squamosals and had V-shaped hind margins, with emargination (a series of notches) spanning their entire width.

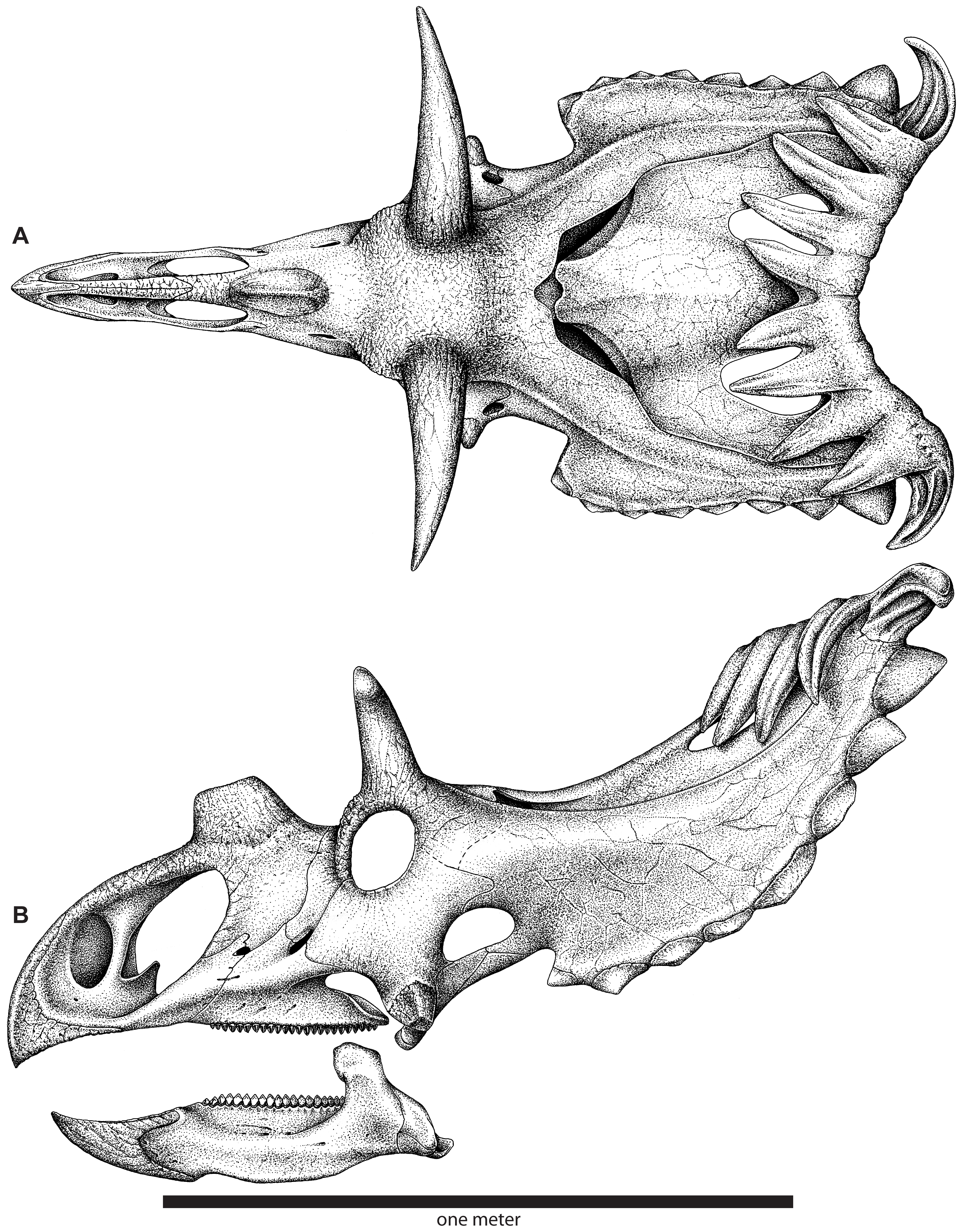
Diagram showing the skull from above and the left side

The epiossifications on the squamosal bones of Kosmoceratops became progressively larger towards the back of the neck frill. There were five well-developed epiossifications per side on the hind-margin of the frill: three forward-curved epiparietals (ep 1–3) on the parietal bone, one forward-curved epiparietosquamosal (esp) on the border between the parietal and squamosal bones, and one episquamosal (es1) on the squamosal bone that was directed to the side and downward. The forward-curving epiparietals had prominent sulci (grooves), and their bases were coalesced. With fifteen well-developed horns and horn-like structures, Kosmoceratops possessed the most ornate skull of any known dinosaurs; this included one nasal horncore, two postorbital horncores, two epijugals, and ten well-developed epiossifications at the back of the frill. The subadult specimen UMNH VP 16878 had the same number and patterns of epiossifications as the adult holotype, making it possible to distinguish the subadult growth stage of Kosmoceratops from that of Utahceratops.

The epiossification numbering system presented above follows that used by Sampson and colleagues in 2010, but note that Fowler and Fowler proposed an alternate system in 2020, based on comparison with earlier Chasmosaurus species. Following this system, epiparietals 1-3 of Kosmoceratops were collectively a single, sideways expanded ep1, the epiparietosquamosal became epiparietal 2, and the episquamosal was epiparietal 3. The epiossification numbers of Vagaceratops were similarly revised.

== Classification ==
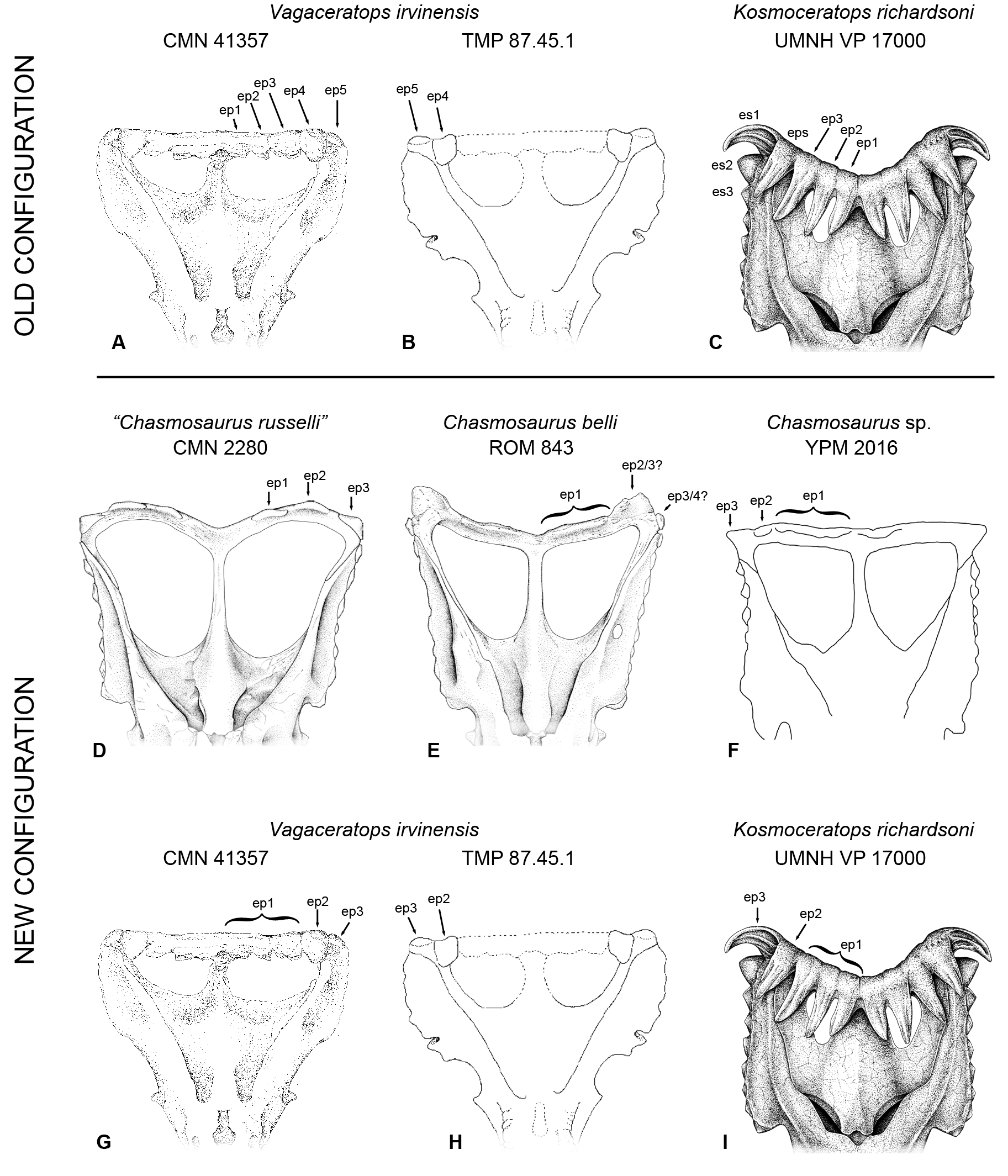
Epiossification numbering system used for Kosmoceratops (right, shaded) and its relatives by Sampson and colleagues, 2010, above and that of Fowler & Fowler, 2020, below, which has led to different interpretations about their evolutionary relationships

Two clades (groups consisting of all taxa that share a common ancestor) of ceratopsid dinosaurs—Centrosaurinae and Chasmosaurinae—are recognized based mainly on the elaborate ornamentation of their skull roofs. In 2010, Sampson and colleagues placed Kosmoceratops in the latter group due to the premaxilla having a narial strut and a triangular process, as well as the presence of an elongated squamosal bone. Their phylogenetic analysis found Kosmoceratops to be the sister taxon to Vagaceratops, in a clade grouped with derived chasmosaurines from the latest Campanian and Maastrichtian stages of the Late Cretaceous epoch including Triceratops, but not closely related to the more basal (or "primitive") Chasmosaurus. In 2011, the paleontologist Jordan C. Mallon and colleagues also found support for the clade containing Kosmoceratops and Vagaceratops, as did the paleontologists Steven L. Wick and Thomas M. Lehman in 2013.

In 2011 and 2014, Longrich found the sole species of Vagaceratops to be retained in Chasmosaurus, where it had been placed originally (as C. irvinensis), while Kosmoceratops did not cluster closely with other taxa. In his 2015 article that failed peer review, Longrich argued that the similarity between the neck frills of the two was due to convergent evolution, stating that the ten epiossifications on the back of the frill of C. irvinensis (or Vagaceratops, which he by then conceded could be a distinct genus) were located on the parietal bones but were located on both the parietal and squamosal bones in Kosmoceratops (Sampson and colleagues stated that they were located on the parietal and squamosals in both). In a 2014 Master's thesis, Campbell stated that Sampson and colleagues had initially identified all ten epiossifications on the hind margin of the frill of the adult Kosmoceratops as epiparietals, before realizing that only six of them were epiparietals after examining the subadult specimen, where the sutures between the parietal and squamosal bones were more evident (sutures fuse and become less apparent with age). Sampson and colleagues had therefore also reinterpreted the pattern of epiossifications in Vagaceratops similarly, but Campbell suggested that it had four or five epiparietals instead, therefore finding it to be the sister taxon to Chasmosaurus rather than Kosmoceratops. Campbell and colleagues also found Vagaceratops to be more closely related to Chasmosaurus than Kosmoceratops in 2016, and in 2019, they considered V. irvinensis to be a species of Chasmosaurus.

In a 2011 conference abstract, the paleontologist Denver W. Fowler and colleagues suggested that many ceratopsid genera were merely ontogenetic morphs (or growth stages) of other genera and that Kosmoceratops was an immature stage of C. irvinensis (with the prominent skull ornamentation reducing with age). In 2015, the paleontologists Caleb M. Brown and Donald M. Henderson tested a new scheme for homology between epiossifications in different chasmosaurines (which of these that corresponded to each other between taxa), and found the clade containing Kosmoceratops and Vagaceratops to be the sister taxon of all other chasmosaurines, contrary to earlier studies. In a 2016 popular book, the paleontologist Gregory S. Paul suggested that Kosmoceratops and Vagaceratops were not distinct enough from Chasmosaurus to warrant their own genus and that their species should be placed in it (or alternatively that the two should be united under Kosmoceratops), while also synonymizing several other chasmosaurine genera with Chasmosaurus. Most ceratopsid genera are generally considered monotypic (containing a single species).

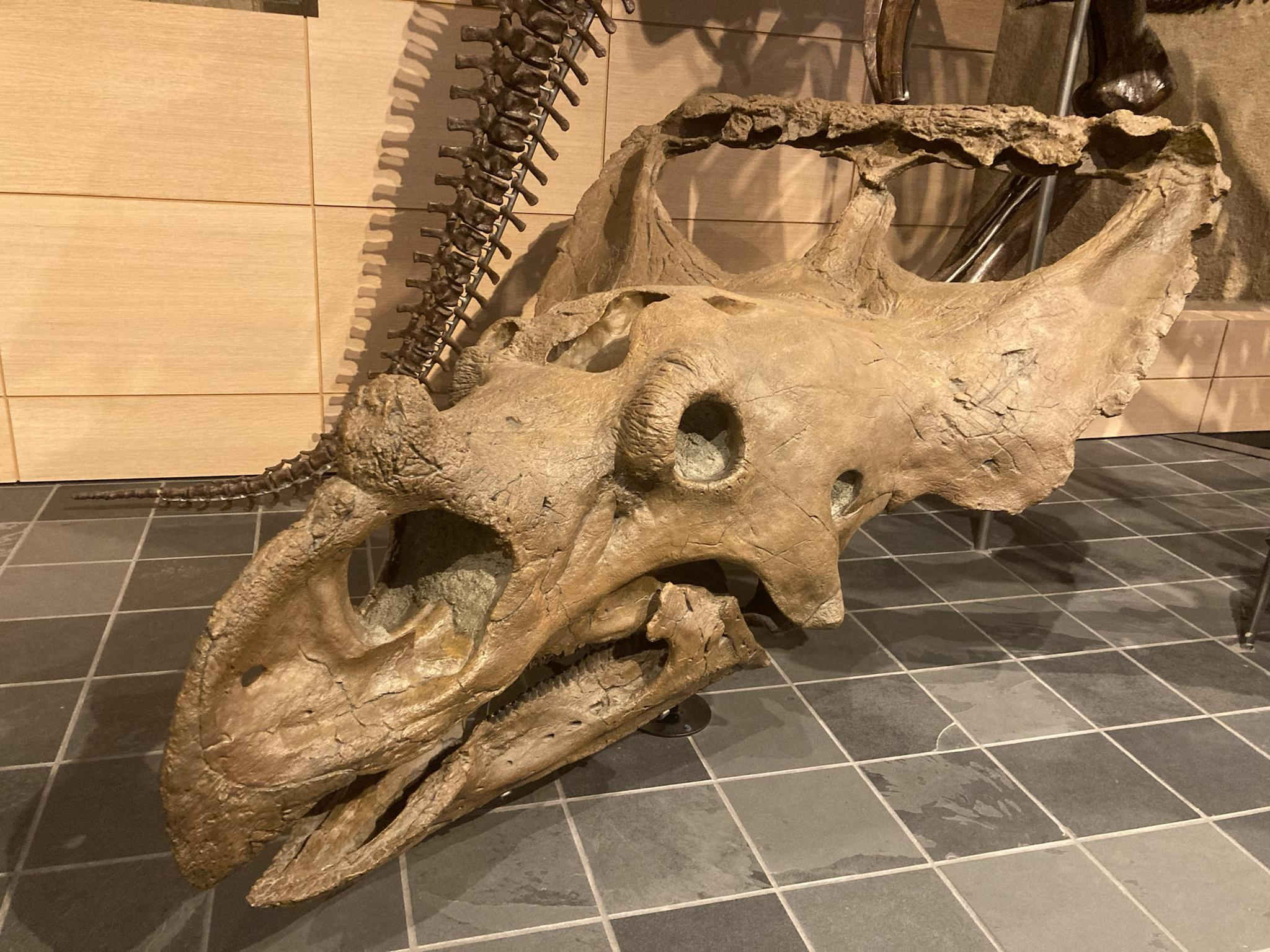
Skull cast of Vagaceratops (note forwards curved epiossifications on the neck frill); researchers debate whether it was most closely related to Kosmoceratops or Chasmosaurus.

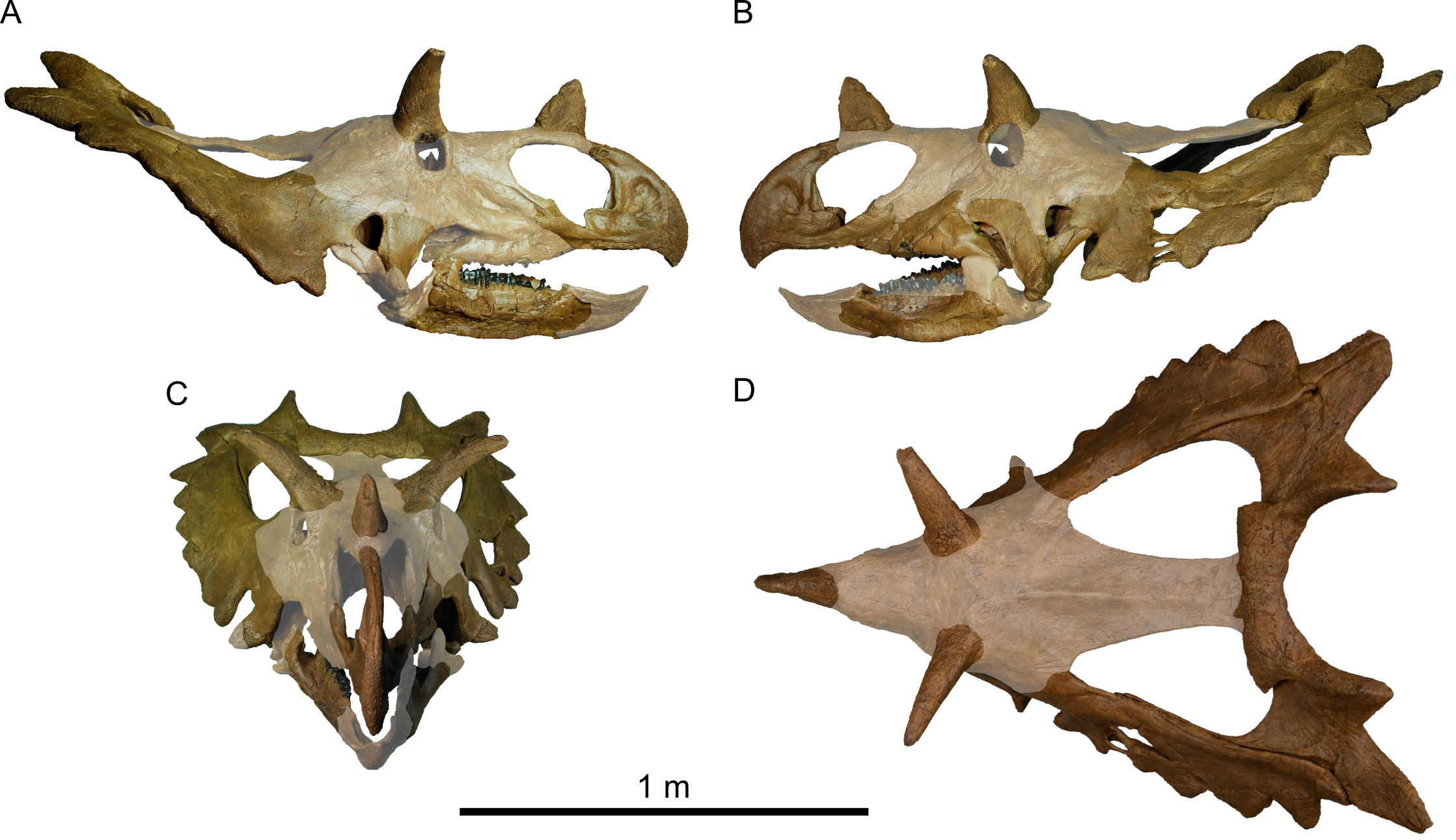
The forwards curved epiossifications on the middle of the neck frill in Spiclypeus may show a transition towards the condition seen in Kosmoceratops.

In 2016, Mallon and colleagues found Kosmoceratops and Vagaceratops to form a clade, with the new genus Spiclypeus as sister taxon. While they acknowledged that some researchers had grouped Vagaceratops with Chasmosaurus instead, they found the forward-curled epiossifications at the back of the frill very distinctive, suggesting that Spiclypeus provided clues to explain the evolution of this feature. They suggested that the curving of these epiossifications occurred stepwise on the lineage leading to Kosmoceratops, those in the middle curling first, followed by those at the sides. This process would have occurred before the shortening of the frill and constriction of the parietal fenestrae, since these features were in their more "primitive", unaltered condition in Spiclypeus. Despite Spiclypeus being seemingly transitional in these regards, it lived around the same time as Kosmoceratops and therefore could not have been ancestral to it. The cladogram below is based on Mallon and colleagues' 2016 analysis:

- Ceratopsidae
  - Centrosaurinae
  - Chasmosaurinae
    - - - - Utahceratops gettyi
          - - Pentaceratops sternbergii
            - - Spiclypeus shipporum
              - - Kosmoceratops richardsoni
                - Vagaceratops irvinensis
        - - Agujaceratops mariscalensis
          - - Mojoceratops perifania
            - - Chasmosaurus belli
              - Chasmosaurus russelli
      - Coahuilaceratops magnacuerna
    - - Anchiceratops ornatus
      - Regaliceratops peterhewsi
      - - Arrhinoceratops brachyops
        - Triceratopsini

In 2020, Fowler and Fowler described two new chasmosaurine genera, and suggested the subfamily had a deep evolutionary split between a clade containing Chasmosaurus and its closest relatives, and Pentaceratops and its relatives. Contrary to previous studies and informed by their new epiossification numbering system, Kosmoceratops was found to be closer to Chasmosaurus, and together with Vagaceratops, represented the most derived and youngest members of that lineage. According to this interpretation, Kosmoceratops evolved from Vagaceratops, which evolved from Chasmosaurus. As they found Vagaceratops likely to be the sister taxon of Kosmoceratops, they suggested it should be maintained as a distinct genus from Chasmosaurus, as its placement would probably remain unstable until chasmosaurines are better understood. Spiclypeus was not evaluated in their study, among other recently named chasmosaurines.

== Paleobiology ==
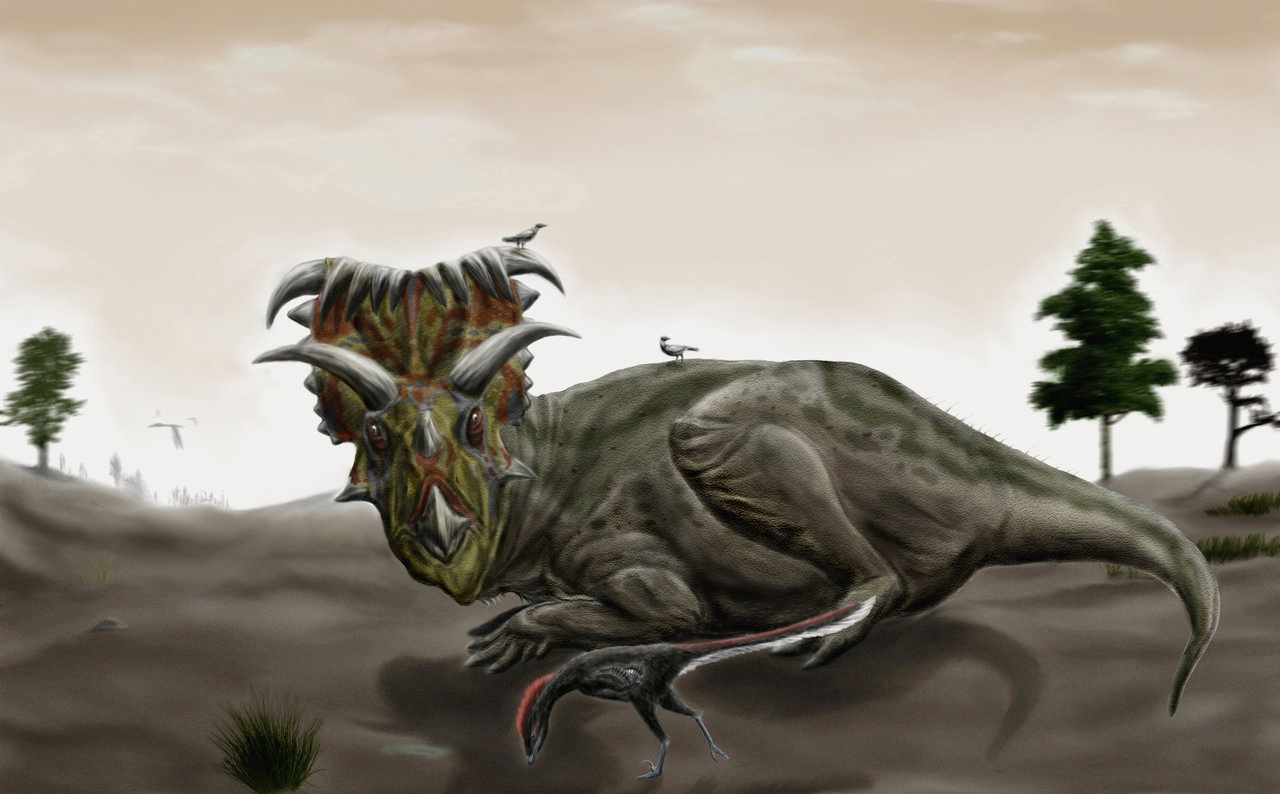
A resting Kosmoceratops being disturbed by the troodontid Talos

In a 2013 Master's thesis (summarized in a published paper by different authors in 2019), the paleontologist Carolyn Gale Levitt histologically studied the long bones of Kosmoceratops (femora of the adult holotype and the assigned subadult or adult UMNH VP 21339) and Utahceratops to examine indicators of growth and maturity in the bone microstructure (until then the only chasmosaurines ever sampled for this). The bone tissue had a high number of osteocytes (bone cells) as well as a dense network of blood vessels, including radially oriented vascular canals (blood canals running towards the bone interior), indicating sustained rapid growth. These features also indicate that ceratopsians had an elevated metabolism and were homeothermic and endothermic (or "warm-blooded"), like modern birds and mammals. The Kosmoceratops and Utahceratops bones sampled by Levitt did not show evidence of lines of arrested growth (annual growth lines), and compared with the ceratopsids Pachyrhinosaurus, Centrosaurus, and Einosaurus from further north which did have growth lines, this may indicate that bone growth reacted to climate and that Kosmoceratops and Utahceratops could sustain their growth throughout the year due to their more equitable southern climate. The lack of growth lines also means that the individual ages of the Kosmoceratops and Utahceratops specimens cannot be estimated, but Levitt determined that the examined Kosmoceratops specimens were subadult to adult, ruling out Fowler and colleagues' 2011 claim that they represented immature Vagaceratops. She also determined that the largest Kosmoceratops and Utahceratops were adults, and therefore ruled out that one was the juvenile of the other.

In a 2017 Master's thesis, the paleontologist Nicole Marie Ridgwell described two coprolites (fossilized dung) from the Kaiparowits Formation which, due to their size, may have been produced by a member of one of three herbivorous dinosaur groups known from the formation: ceratopsians (including Kosmoceratops), hadrosaurs, or ankylosaurs (rarest of the three groups). The coprolites contained fragments of angiosperm wood (which indicates a diet of woody browse); though there was previously little evidence of dinosaurs consuming angiosperms, these coprolites showed that dinosaurs adapted to feeding on them (they only became common in the Early Cretaceous, diversifying in the Late Cretaceous). The coprolites also contained traces of mollusc shell, arthropod cuticle, and lizard bone that may have been ingested along with the plant material. They were found near other herbivore coprolites that contained conifer wood. Ridgwell pointed out that the dental anatomies of ceratopsians and hadrosaurs (with dental batteries comprising continuously replaced teeth) were adapted to process large quantities of fibrous plants. The different diets represented by the coprolites may indicate niche partitioning among the herbivores of the Kaiparowits Formation ecosystem, or that there was seasonal variation in diet.

=== Function of skull ornamentation ===
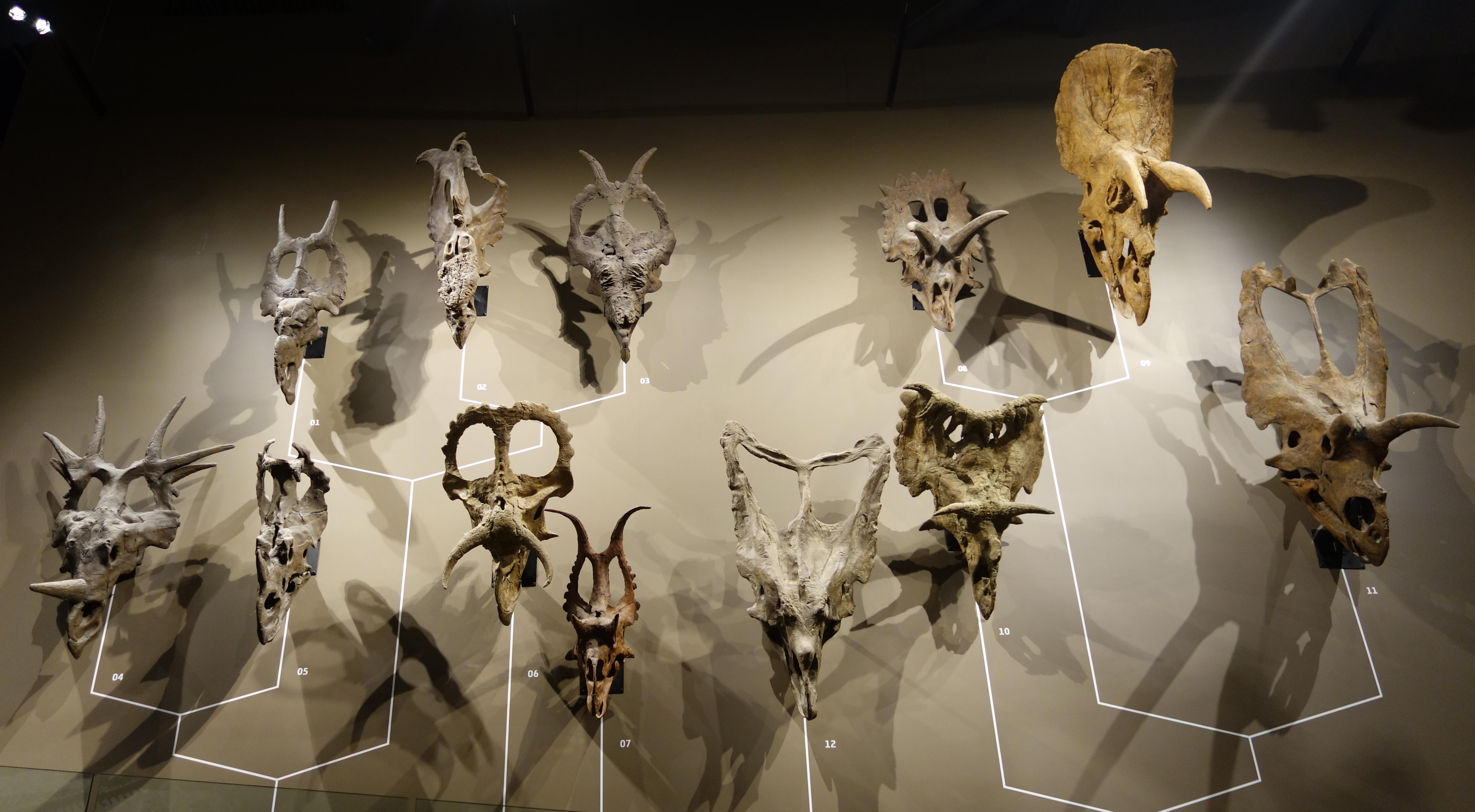
Ceratopsid skull casts positioned in a phylogenetic tree; Kosmoceratops is located middle right (10).

The possible functions of ceratopsian horns and frills have been debated, including fighting off predators, species recognition, and temperature control, though the dominant hypothesis involves enhancing reproductive success. In a 2010 press release presenting Kosmoceratops, Utahceratops, and Vagaceratops, Sampson stated that most of these "bizarre features" would have been insufficient weapons against predators, but would have been used to intimidate or fight rivals of the same sex and attract individuals of the opposite sex. In 2011, the paleontologists Kevin Padian and John R. Horner proposed that "bizarre structures" in dinosaurs (including horns, frills, domes, and crests) were primarily used for species recognition (to differentiate between sympatric species; related species that lived in the same area at the same time), and they dismissed other explanations as unsupported by evidence. They noted that many large ceratopsians had openings in their frills, making them of little use in defense, and that the wide variety in the size and orientation of their horns did not have an obvious function in combat. They also pointed out that there is little evidence for sexual dimorphism in ceratopsians. Responding to Padian and Horner the same year, the paleontologist Rob J. Knell and Sampson argued that while species recognition could have been a secondary function of "bizarre structures", sexual selection (used in display or combat to compete for mates) was a more likely explanation because of the high cost of developing them and how they appeared to be highly variable within species. They also pointed out that a lack of sexual dimorphism does not preclude the use of horns in mate competition; male bovines use their horns for this purpose while females use them primarily for defense and secondarily for sexual selection.

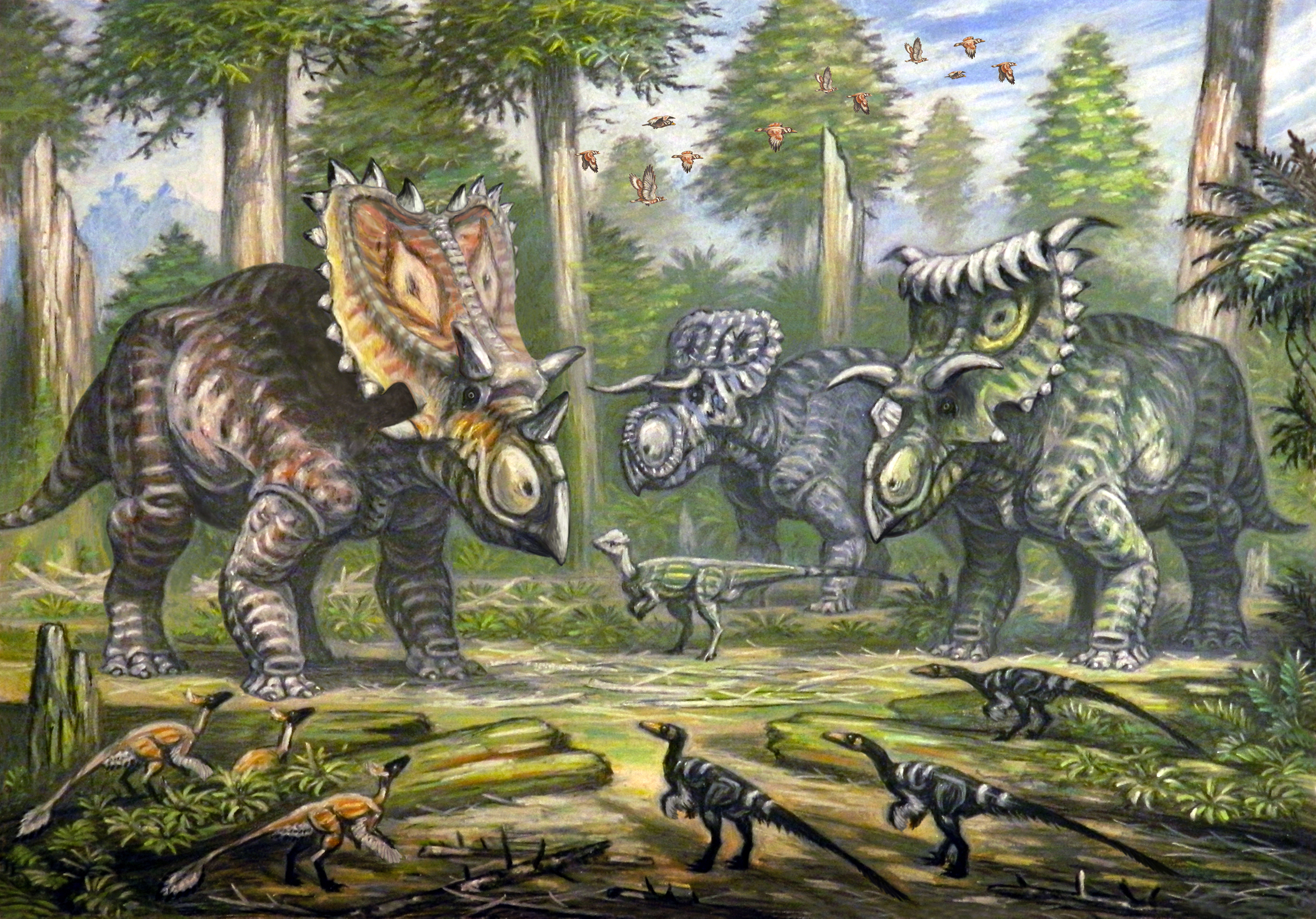
Three ceratopsids from the Kaiparowits Formation: Utahceratops, Nasutoceratops, and Kosmoceratops

In 2013, the paleontologists David E. Hone and Darren Naish criticized the "species recognition hypothesis", arguing that no extant animals use such structures primarily for species recognition and that Padian and Horner had ignored the possibility of mutual sexual selection (where both sexes are ornamented). They noted that if the primary purpose of the structures was species recognition, they would have differed in the shape of a single structure because additional structures would have been redundant at additional cost. Ceratopsians, for example, had elaborate nasal horn, brow horn, jugal boss, frill midline, and frill edge features, as well as differences in body size and proportions, while the absence or presence of a single horn would have been enough to differentiate between sympatric species. In 2018, the paleontologist Andrew Knapp and colleagues examined whether the diverging ornamental traits of ceratopsians were correlated with sympatricity between two or more species, as would be predicted by the "species recognition hypothesis". They found that display patterns diverged widely overall while those of sympatric species did not differ significantly from those of non-sympatric species, concluding that the hypothesis did not have statistical support among ceratopsians.

In 2015, biologist Pasquale Raia and colleagues examined the evolutionary increase in the complexity and size of animal ornaments (such as crests, horns, and tusks) over time, using ammonites, deer, and ceratopsians as examples. Frill complexity in ceratopsians appeared to have increased in more recent species, and Kosmoceratops had the highest values of fractal dimensions in its neck frill margin (followed by Styracosaurus, Diabloceratops, and Centrosaurus). The authors found that ornament complexity increased with body size, suggesting that the evolution of ornament complexity was a byproduct of Cope's rule (which postulates that population lineages tend to increase in body size over evolutionary time). They argued that though the size of most ornaments may be controlled by sexual selection (and whether they are used for choosing mates, competition, or both), it does not influence complexity and shape, concluding that it is probably the size rather than the shape of ornaments that is acted upon by sexual selection.

== Paleoenvironment ==
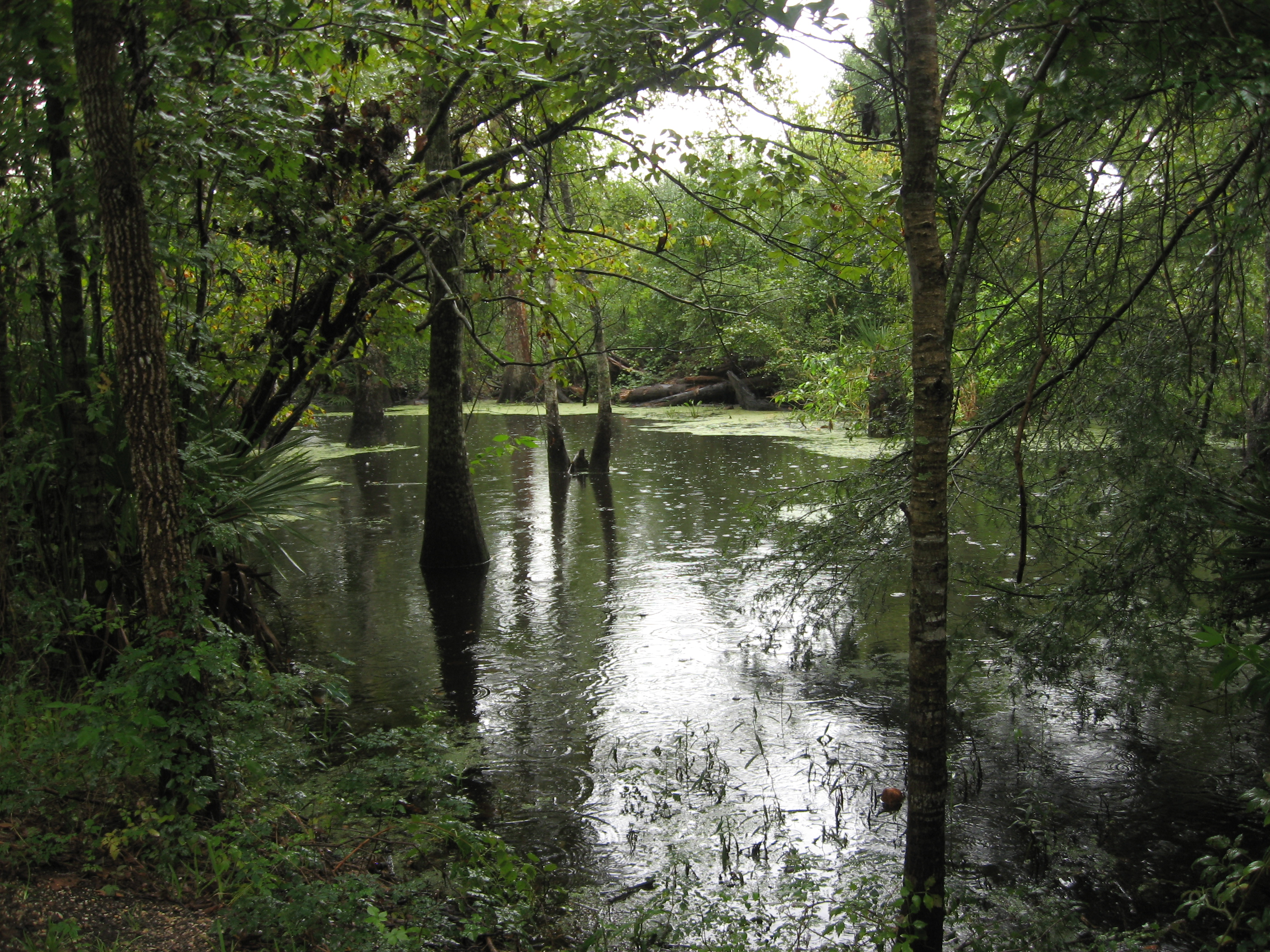
The Kaiparowits Formation environment has been compared with the swamplands of Louisiana.

Kosmoceratops is known from the Kaiparowits Formation of Utah, which dates to the late Campanian age of the Late Cretaceous epoch, and occurs in a stratigraphic range spanning the upper part of its lower unit to the upper part of its middle unit, in sediments dating to 76.4–75.5 million years ago. The formation was deposited in the southern part of a basin (the Western Interior Basin) on the eastern margin of a landmass known as Laramidia (an island continent consisting of what is now western North America) within 100 km (62 mi) of the Western Interior Seaway, a shallow sea in the center of North America that divided the continent (the eastern landmass is known as Appalachia). The basin was broad, flat, crescent-shaped, and bounded by mountains on all sides except the Western Interior Seaway at the east. The formation represents an alluvial to coastal plain setting that was wet, humid, and dominated by large, deep channels with stable banks and perennial wetland swamps, ponds, and lakes. Rivers flowed generally west across the plains and drained into the Western Interior Seaway; the Gulf Coast region of the United States has been proposed as a good modern analogue (such as the current day swamplands of Louisiana). The formation preserves a diverse and abundant range of fossils, including continental and aquatic animals, plants, and palynomorphs (organic microfossils).

Other ornithischian dinosaurs from the Kaiparowits Formation include ceratopsians such as the chasmosaurine Utahceratops, the centrosaurine Nasutoceratops (and possibly a second yet unnamed centrosaurine), indeterminate pachycephalosaurs, the ankylosaurid Akainacephalus, an indeterminate nodosaurid, the hadrosaurs Gryposaurus and Parasaurolophus, and an indeterminate, basal neornithischian. Theropods include the tyrannosaurid Teratophoneus, the oviraptorosaur Hagryphus, an unnamed ornithomimid, the troodontid Talos, indeterminate dromaeosaurids, and the bird Avisaurus. Other vertebrates include crocodiles (such as Deinosuchus and Brachychampsa), turtles (such as Adocus and Basilemys), pterosaurs, lizards, snakes, amphibians, mammals, and fishes. The two most common groups of large vertebrates in the formation are hadrosaurs and ceratopsians (the latter representing about 14 percent of associated vertebrate fossils), which may either indicate their abundance in the Kaiparowits fauna or reflect preservation bias (a type of sampling bias) due to these groups also having the most robust skeletal elements. Eggs from dinosaurs, crocodiles, and turtles have also been found. The swamps and wetlands were dominated by up to 30 m (98 ft) cypress trees, ferns, and aquatic plants including giant duckweed, water lettuce, and other floating angiosperms. Better-drained areas were dominated by forests of up to 10–20 m (33–66 ft) dicot trees and occasional palms, with an understory including ferns. Well-drained areas further away from wet areas were dominated by conifers up to 30 m (98 ft), with an understory comprising cycads, small dicot trees or bushes, and possibly ferns.

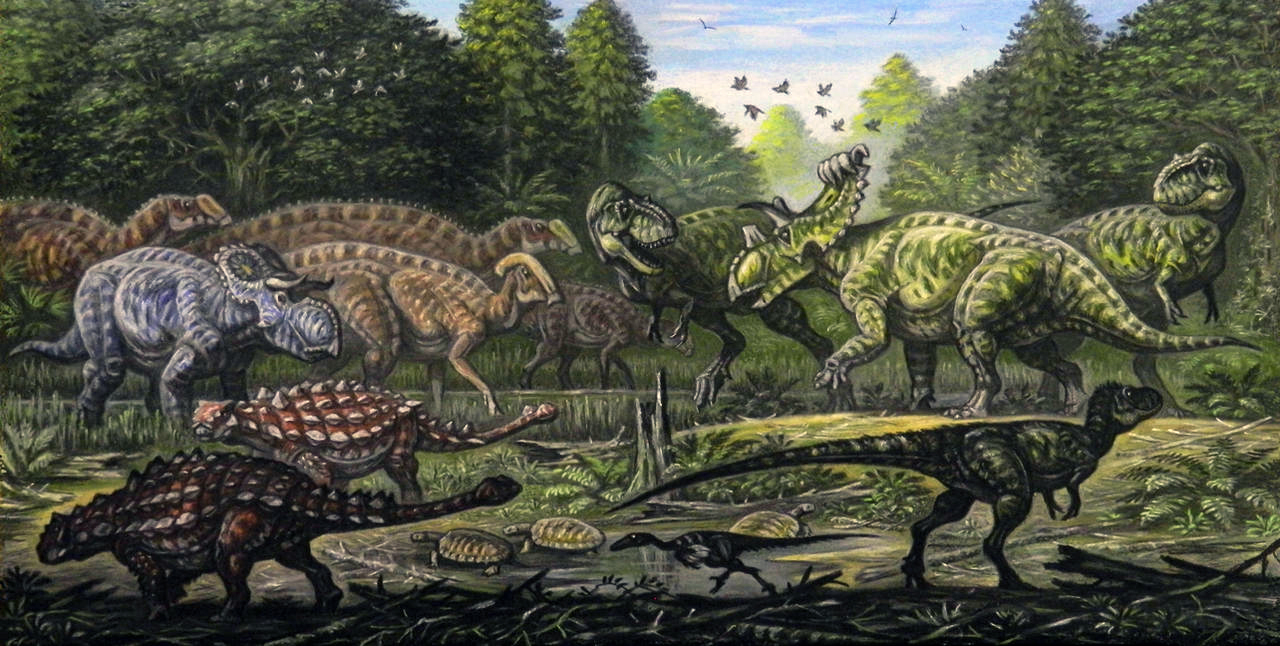
Restoration of Kosmoceratops being confronted by Teratophoneus, surrounded by other animals of the Kaiparowits Formation

In 2010, the paleontologist Michael A. Getty and colleagues examined the taphonomy of the holotype and the subadult specimen UMNH VP 16878 and the sedimentological circumstances under which they were preserved. The more or less articulated holotype specimen was found in a silty sandstone channel lithofacies (the rock record of a sedimentary environment), which is consistent with its carcass having been washed into a river channel, then buried quickly. The limbs and part of the tail may have been lost to scavengers or rot prior to the carcass being deposited. The parts missing from the left side of the skull were lost to erosion before the discovery. Since much of the skeleton was still under preparation at the time, researchers were unable to examine it for signs of predation and scavenging. The subadult specimen UMNH VP 16878 was found scattered across an area of 3 m^{2} (32 sq ft), and the high degree of disarticulation and broken parts indicate that the specimen was skeletonized and decomposed before its burial in silty mudstone lithofacies. Levitt reported that every bone of the assigned subadult or adult specimen UMNH VP 21339 appeared to have been broken before depositing, and its matrix is stacked siltstones and mudstones with minor sandstones, which suggests a pond environment.

=== Paleobiogeography ===
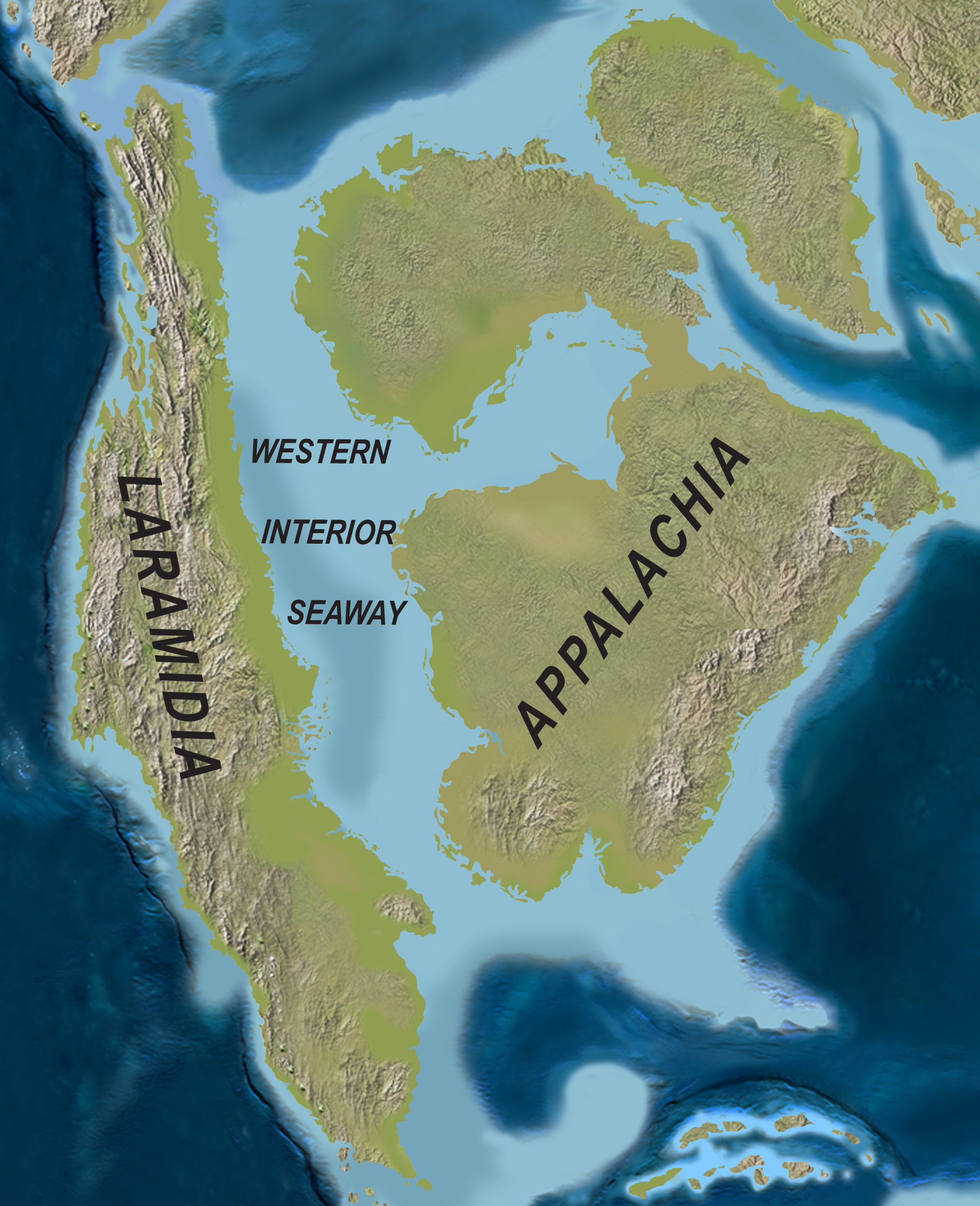
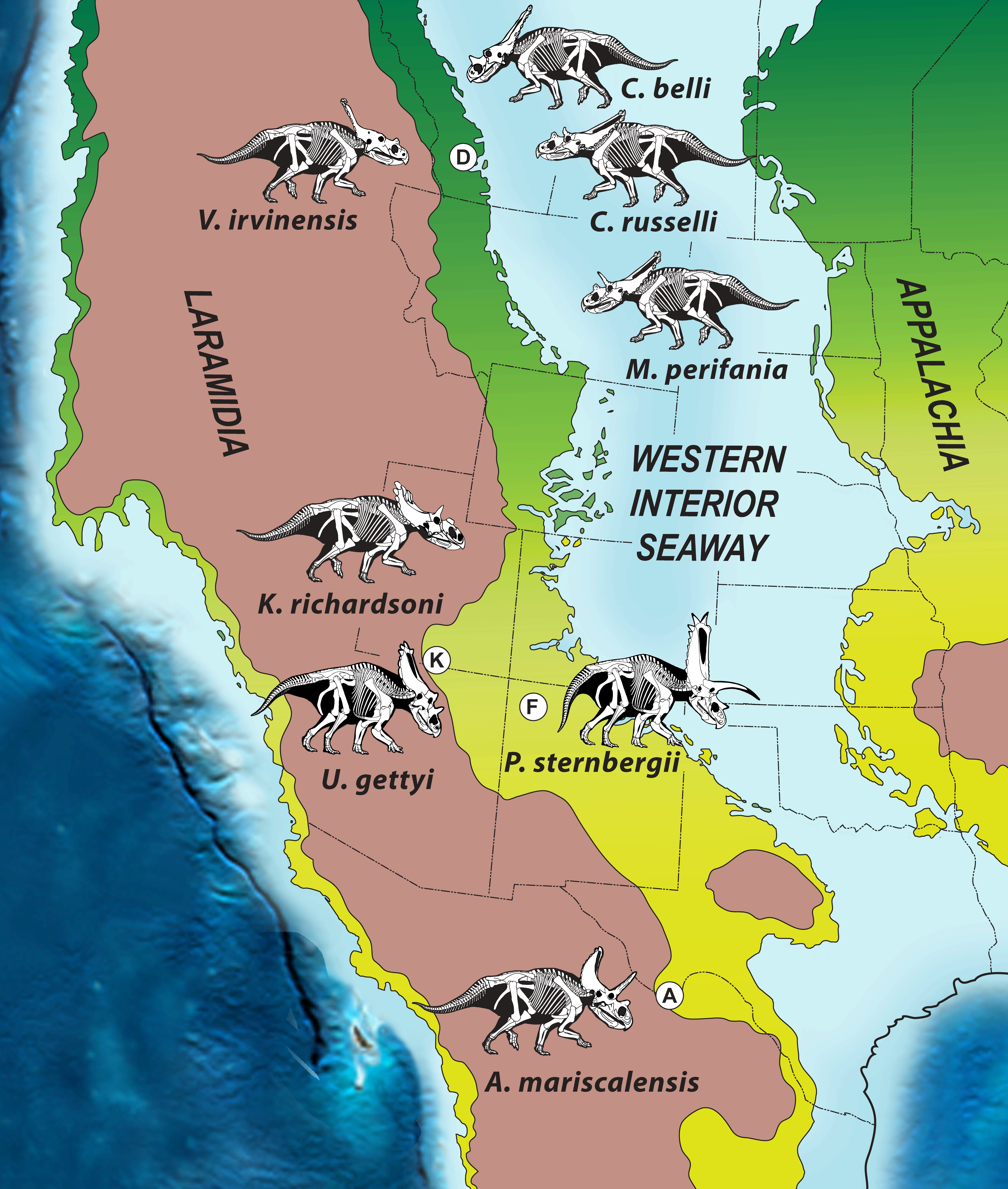
Paleomap of North America during the Campanian age (left), and biogeography of contemporary chasmosaurines known by 2010 (right); Kosmoceratops lived in southern Laramidia

Though the area of Laramidia was only 20 percent that of modern North America, it saw a major evolutionary radiation of dinosaurs, including the common hadrosaurs and ceratopsians. It has been postulated that there was a latitudinal array of dinosaur "provinces" or biomes on Laramidia during the Campanian and Maastrichtian ages of the Late Cretaceous, the boundary lying around modern northern Utah and Colorado; the same major clades are known from the north and south but are distinct from each other at the genus and species levels. This hypothesis has been challenged; one argument claims that northern and southern dinosaur assemblages during this time were not coeval but reflect a taxonomic distribution over time, which gives the illusion of geographically isolated provinces, and that the distinct assemblages may be an artifact of sampling bias between geological formations. Due to a lack of well-dated fossils from southern Laramidia, this idea had been difficult to test, but discoveries in the Kaiparowits Formation have increased knowledge of fossil vertebrates from the region during the Late Cretaceous. The evolutionary radiation of ceratopsids appears to have been restricted both in time and geographically (the turnover of species was high, and each existed for less than a million years), most taxa being known from latest Cretaceous sediments in the Western Interior Basin, therefore appearing to have originated and diversified on Laramidia.

The discovery of Kosmoceratops and Utahceratops greatly increased the number of known chasmosaurines from the Western Interior Basin. Sampson and colleagues viewed this as the strongest support for the idea of dinosaur "provinces" in their 2010 description. They pointed out that in contrast to the Maastrichtian, the preceding Campanian stage had a better sampled, diverse, and far-ranging dinosaur assemblage, as well as more precise geographical and stratigraphical data. The stratigraphic ranges of Kosmoceratops and Utahceratops show that they lived at the same time and likely in the same ecosystems, which was rare among ceratopsids. According to Sampson and colleagues, geochronologic dating indicates that the brief geological interval preserved within the Kaiparowits Formation was contemporaneous with the Dinosaur Park Formation in Alberta and followed other formations in the north (the upper Judith River and Two Medicine formations) and southeast (the Fruitland and Aguja formations), with the brief duration, overlap in time, and longitudinal span permitting significant comparisons between them. That Kosmoceratops and Utahceratops were not closely related to each other or to Chasmosaurus and Mojoceratops from the coeval Dinosaur Park Formation, and that Vagaceratops from Alberta overlapped with Pentaceratops from New Mexico in time, were cited by Sampson and colleagues as evidence against the claim that northern and southern dinosaur assemblages were not coeval during this time.

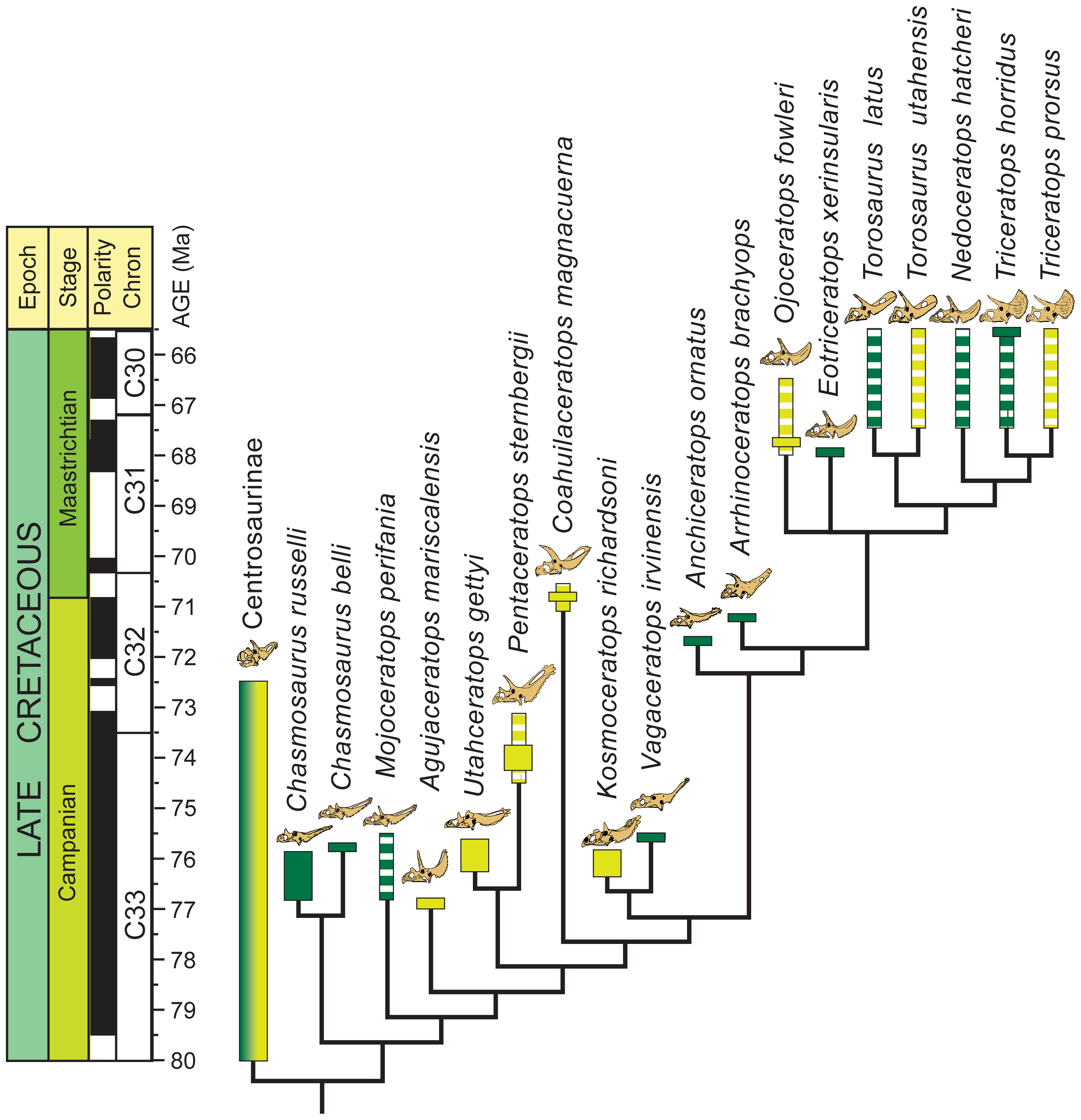
Phylogenetic relationships among chasmosaurines and their temporal ranges, according to Sampson and colleagues, 2010

Sampson and colleagues stated that their study was the first time intracontinental endemism within dinosaurs was documented (with distinct chasmosaurine taxa co-occurring north and south on Laramidia). They suggested a sequence of events in the evolution of chasmosaurines that they found consistent with the phylogenetic, stratigraphic, and biogeographic evidence. According to them, chasmosaurines originated in Laramidia around 80–90 million years ago and dispersed throughout much of this landmass by 77 million years ago. By this time, a barrier had appeared in the area of Utah and Colorado, preventing animals dispersing between north and south Laramidia and leading to northern and southern chasmosaurines (and probably other animal clades) evolving independently through vicariance within separate, latitudinally arrayed centers of endemism 77.0–75.8 million years ago. After the barrier dissolved around 75.7 million years ago, the Kosmoceratops lineage (represented by Vagaceratops) that had been restricted to southern Laramidia dispersed to the north, giving rise to all later chasmosaurines, such as Anchiceratops and Triceratops.

Though late Campanian dinosaurs on Laramidia were larger than most large modern animals (which require large species ranges due to heightened dietary needs), Sampson and colleagues found that they appeared to have had relatively small species ranges, which is more perplexing due to the high species-diversity of Laramidian dinosaurs. Though they apparently inhabited at least two semi-isolated regions, there is no evidence of a dispersal barrier, and there was less of a temperature gradient than today. The dinosaurs there appear to have been sensitive to latitudinal zonation in environment (potentially due to lowered physiologies or the environments being more productive), which possibly persisted for at least 1.5 million years. Alternatives to the existence of a barrier include that the discrete provinces were separated by zones of faunal mixing, or that there was a continuous gradient or cline throughout the altitude, with no distinct endemic zones. Possible physical barriers to dispersal include an unidentified mountain range from east to west, flooding in the plain regions by the Western Interior Seaway (which would have temporarily eliminated low-elevation habitats in central Laramidia), or a major river system. Sampson and colleagues considered it more likely that there had been a paleoclimatic or paleoenvironmental barrier to dispersal (an idea supported by divergent types of pollen in northern and southern Laramidia), but noted that more evidence is needed to investigate the nature of separation between faunal provinces in Laramidia.

In 2012, the paleontologist Terry A. Gates and colleagues suggested that the increase in North American dinosaur biodiversity during the Campanian was due to orogenic events (which lead to changes in the Earth's crust where continental plates meet) in the Western Interior Basin, including the incipient confluence of the Sevier Orogenic Belt and plate tectonics on Laramidia, which formed mountains that isolated ceratopsids and hadrosaurids and led to their diversification. They suggested that the split of Kosmoceratops and Vagaceratops from the clade that included Anchiceratops and Triceratops was caused by either a vicariance or dispersal event. After concluding in 2014 that Vagaceratops was more closely related to Chasmosaurus than Kosmoceratops, Campbell suggested that Vagaceratops originated in northern Laramidia. He disputed that it had migrated there from the south, which was claimed by Sampson and colleagues (making its name, "wandering horned face", a misnomer).

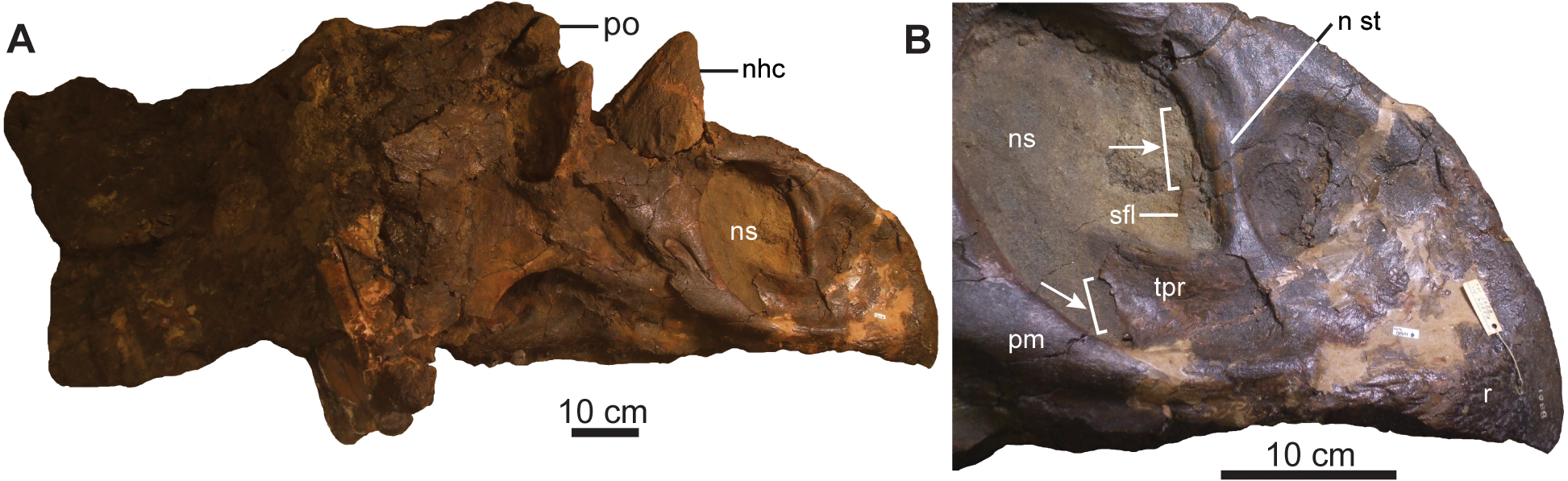
CMN 8801, a partial skull from Alberta that was assigned to Kosmoceratops sp. in 2014 (which would have major paleobiogeographic implications), but assigned back to Chasmosaurus in 2016

With his 2014 assignment of skull CMN 8801 to Kosmoceratops sp. and his naming of a new species of Pentaceratops (P. aquilonius), both from the Dinosaur Park of Alberta, Longrich argued against the idea of distinct northern and southern dinosaur provinces, since the two genera were now known from both southeastern and northern North America. Since northern animals did differ from their southern counterparts, he agreed that there was significant endemism during the Campanian, but found that dinosaur lineages were able to disperse for long distances and were not constrained by geographic barriers, climate, or flora, endemism instead being the result of established (and locally adapted) populations excluding migrant dinosaurs through competition. In 2016, Campbell and colleagues assigned CMN 8801 back to Chasmosaurus, and supported the idea that Kosmoceratops was restricted to southern Laramidia. The same year, Mallon and colleagues found P. aquilonius to be an invalid nomen dubium (dubious name) and agreed that there had been a dispersal barrier between north and south Laramidia. They suggested that the close relationship between Kosmoceratops and Spiclypeus from Montana in the north indicated there had been some short-lived geographic connection.

In 2016, the paleontologist Spencer G. Lucas and colleagues criticized the idea of north–south dinosaur provinciality in Laramidia, and found the case for endemism among non-dinosaurian vertebrates weak, and that of dinosaurs problematic, as mainly a few chasmosaurine taxa were used to identify it. They rejected the idea of dinosaur endemism and provinciality because of problems with sampling biases (the impression that dinosaurs diversified during the Campanian is a result of the denser fossil record from this time), a lack of topographic barriers that would divide provinces (Gates and colleagues had supposedly misunderstood the topographic effects of orogeny on Laramidia), a lack of significant climatic or vegetational differences, the taxonomic decisions that have been involved in the perception of the idea, the diachroneity (difference in age) of most fossil assemblages preventing their use in biogeographic analyses, and that the conclusions of those that support the idea are not uniform and undermine their arguments. For example, they pointed out that contrary to the claim made by Sampson and colleagues, Kosmoceratops and Utahceratops were not contemporaneous with Vagaceratops (which was younger) and all were older than Pentaceratops. Lucas and colleagues conceded that there was some endemism that could not be accounted for by sampling biases, but they agreed with Longrich that this may have been due to competition or dietary specialization.

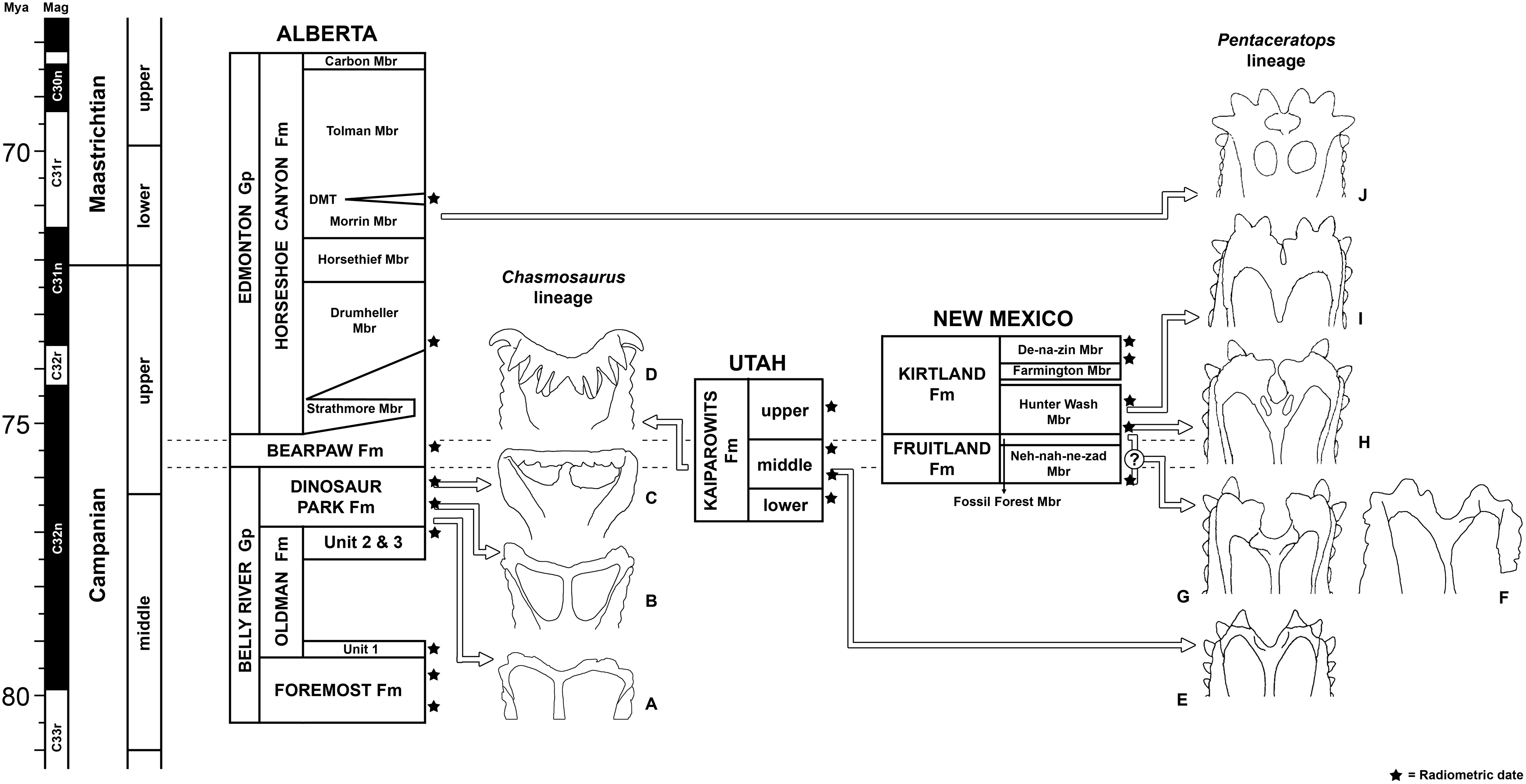
Diagram showing stratigraphic positions of the two main chasmosaurine clades proposed in 2020, with Kosmoceratops in the Chasmosaurus lineage (left)

In 2017, Fowler pointed out that the date of the Kaiparowits Formation which had been used by Sampson and colleagues to demonstrate that Kosmoceratops and Utahceratops were coeval with chasmosaurines from other formations in the north, had been calibrated differently from those of the other formations. When recalibrated to the same standards, he showed that the stratigraphic overlap between these taxa was not recognized. Instead, only the lower part of the Kaiparowits Formation overlapped with the Dinosaur Park Formation, but this part does not contain Kosmoceratops and Utahceratops, whereas fragmentary remains suggest that some taxa were shared between the formations at this range. Fowler therefore found it more likely that the differences in dinosaur taxa between the formations were due to sampling different stratigraphic levels rather than biogeographic segregation, an explanation he also found probable for the differences between the Kaiparowits Formation and the Fruitland and Kirtland formations.

While not supporting endemism, Fowler and Fowler suggested in 2020 that there would have been a subtle gradational provincialism of chasmoraurines from North to South, with the lineage including Chasmosaurus being more abundant in the North, Kosmoceratops being its southernmost member, while the lineage including Pentaceratops was more abundant in the South. Since the two clades overlapped geographically during the uppermost part of the middle Campanian, the speciation event that led to the two lineages may have been caused by latitudinal vicariance prior to the appearance of the first member of the Chasmosaurus lineage, 77 million years ago. By 76 million years ago, the supposed barrier dividing the lineages must have disappeared, as they coexisted afterwards; the dividing line appears to have been located somewhere between southern Utah and northern Montana. Fowler and Fowler also found that Vagaceratops lived about 76.2 million years ago while Kosmoceratops lived about 76–75.9 million years ago, and did not overlap stratigraphically.

== See also ==
- Timeline of ceratopsian research
