= Sulcus (morphology) =

Groove in an organ surface

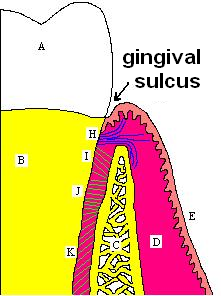
Gingival sulcus at neck of mammalian tooth

Pollen grains of Cercis are sulcate, with reticulate surface.

Rotating image of human brain, illustrating the lateral sulcus in the brain

In biological morphology and anatomy, a sulcus (pl. sulci) is a furrow or fissure (Latin: fissura; pl. fissurae). It may be a groove, natural division, deep furrow, elongated cleft, or tear in the surface of a limb or an organ, most notably on the surface of the brain, but also in the lungs, certain muscles (including the heart), as well as in bones and elsewhere. Many sulci are the product of a surface fold or junction, such as in the gums, where they fold around the neck of the tooth.

In invertebrate zoology, a sulcus is a fold, groove, or boundary, especially at the edges of sclerites or between segments.

In pollen, a grain that is grooved by a sulcus is termed sulcate.

== Examples in anatomy ==
=== Liver ===
- Ligamentum teres hepatis fissure
- Ligamentum venosum fissure
- Portal fissure, found in the under-surface of the liver
- Transverse fissure of liver, found in the lower surface of the liver
- Umbilical fissure, found in front of the liver

=== Lung ===
- Azygos fissure, of right lung
- Horizontal fissure of right lung
- Oblique fissure, of the right and left lungs

=== Skull ===
- Auricular fissure, found in the temporal bone
- Petrotympanic fissure
- Pterygomaxillary fissure
- Sphenoidal fissure, separates the wings and the body of the sphenoid bone
- Superior orbital fissure

=== Other types ===
- anal fissure, a break or tear in the skin of the anal canal
- anterior interventricular sulcus
- calcaneal sulcus
- coronal sulcus
- femoral sulcus or intercondylar fossa of femur
- fissure (dentistry), a break in the tooth enamel
- fissure of the nipple, a condition that results from running, breastfeeding and other friction-causing exposures
- fissured tongue, a condition characterized by deep grooves (fissures) in the tongue
- gingival sulcus
- gluteal sulcus
- Henle's fissure, a fissure in the connective tissue between the muscle fibers of the heart
- interlabial sulci
- intermammary sulcus
- intertubercular sulcus, the groove between the lesser and greater tubercules of the humerus (bone of the upper arm)
- lacrimal sulcus (sulcus lacrimalis)
- malleolar sulcus
- palpebral fissure, separates the upper and lower eyelids
- patellar sulcus or intercondylar fossa of femur
- posterior interventricular sulcus
- preauricular sulcus
- radial sulcus (musculospiral groove)
- sagittal sulcus
- separatoral sulcus (depression behind the brow ridges of some primates)
- sigmoid sulcus
- skin fissure, a linear-like cleavage of skin, sometimes defined as extending into the dermis
- sulcus arteriæ vertebralis
- sulcus subtarsalis in the eyelid
- sulcus tubae auditivae
- tympanic sulcus
- urethral sulcus
- ventral median fissure, of the spinal cord

=== In neuroanatomy ===
==== Brain ====
- Broca's fissure: found in the third left frontal fold of the brain.
- Burdach's fissure: connects the brain's insula and the inner surface of the operculum.
- Calcarine sulcus or Calcerine fissure: extends from the occipital of the cerebrum to the occipital fissure.
- Callosomarginal fissure: found in the medial surface of the cerebrum.
- Central sulcus or Rolando's fissure: separates the brain's frontal and parietal lobes.
- Clevenger's fissure: found in the inferior temporal lobe of the brain
- Collateral fissure: found in the inferior surface of the cerebrum.
- Fissure of Bichat: found below the corpus callosum in the cerebellum of the brain.
- Lateral sulcus or Fissure of Sylvius: separates the frontal and parietal lobes of the brain from the temporal lobe.
- Hippocampal sulcus: a sulcus that extends from the brain's corpus callosum to the tip of the temporal lobe.
- Horizontal fissure or Transverse fissure: found between the cerebrum and the cerebellum. Note that a "transverse fissure" can also be found in the liver and lungs.
- Longitudinal fissure or Medial longitudinal fissure: which divides the cerebrum into the two hemispheres.
- Occipitoparietal fissure: found between the occipital and parietal lobes of the brain.
- Wernicke's fissure: separates the brain's temporal and parietal lobes from the occipital lobe.
- Zygal fissure: found in the cerebrum.

In the brain, a sulcus is a groove formed in the stage of gyrification by the folding of the cortex. There are many sulci and gyri formed. A larger than usual sulcus may instead be called a fissure such as the longitudinal fissure that separates the two hemispheres.

== See also ==
- Sinus (botany)
- Sulcus sign
