= Vertical =

Vertical is a geometric term of location which may refer to:

- Vertical orientation, the orientation aligned with the direction of the force of gravity, up or down
- Vertical (angles), a pair of angles opposite each other, formed by two intersecting straight lines that form an "X"
- Vertical (music), a musical interval where the two notes sound simultaneously
- "Vertical", a type of wine tasting in which different vintages of the same wine type from the same winery are tasted
- Vertical Aerospace, stylised as "Vertical", British aerospace manufacturer
- Vertical kilometer, a discipline of skyrunning
- Vertical market, a market in which vendors offer goods and services specific to an industry
- Vertical integration, a management term describing a style of ownership and control
- Vertical (banknotes), a series of banknotes of the Canadian dollar

== Media ==
- Vertical (film), a 1967 Soviet movie starring Vladimir Vysotsky
- "Vertical" (Sledge Hammer!), 1987 television episode
- Vertical (novel), 2010 novel by Rex Pickett
- Vertical (film company), an American independent film distributor and production company
- Vertical (publisher), a novel and manga imprint of Kodansha USA
- Vertikal, a 2013 album by the Swedish band Cult of Luna

== See also ==
- Vertical blinds, a type of window blind
- Vertical jump, a measure of how high an individual or athlete can elevate off the ground from a standstill
- Vertical loop, a section of roller coaster track which causes the riders to complete a 360 degree turn
- Horizontal (disambiguation)
- Horizontal and vertical (disambiguation)
- ↕, see Arrow (symbol)#Arrows in Unicode
