= Horizontal and vertical (disambiguation) =

Horizontal and vertical commonly refers a concept about orientation in mathematics, geography, physics and other sciences, with the vertical typically being defined by the direction of gravity, and with the horizontal being perpendicular to the vertical.

Horizontal and vertical may also refer to:

== Business ==
- Horizontal and vertical integration, about control of value chains
  - Horizontal integration, when a company increases production of goods or services at the same level of the value chain and in the same industry (e.g via internal expansion, acquisition or merger)
  - Vertical integration, when the supply chain of a company is integrated and owned by that company (i.e. integration of multiple stages of production)
- Horizontal and vertical markets, about which sectors are eligible for marketing
  - Horizontal market, a market characterized by a product or service meeting the needs of a wide range of buyers across different sectors
  - Vertical market, a market characterized by goods and services being offered to a specific industry or group of customers with specialized needs

== Mathematics ==
- Vertical and horizontal bundles, mathematical fiber bundles

== Linguistics ==
- Horizontal and vertical writing in East Asian scripts – many East Asian scripts can be written either horizontally or vertically

== See also ==
- Horizontal (disambiguation)
- Vertical (disambiguation)
