= Sulcus sign =

The sulcus sign is an orthopedic evaluation test for glenohumeral instability of the shoulder. With the arm straight and relaxed to the side of the patient, the elbow is grasped and traction is applied in an inferior direction. With excessive inferior translation, a depression occurs just below the acromion. The appearance of this sulcus is a positive sign.
