= Broca's fissure =

Feature of the human brain

Broca's fissure is a medical and scientific term for a sulcus occurring in the area of the brain known as Broca's area. Broca's area contains the motor speech area and controls movements of tongue, lips and vocal cords. Broca's fissure produces the typical effects of a lesion in Broca's area (i.e., expressive aphasia).

== Treatment ==
Some individuals afflicted with Broca's fissure are aided by speech entrainment(SE).

== Effects ==
Sufferers of Broca's fissure have an inability to understand the processes of syntax and word order. For example, a sufferer is unable to distinguish between the chef burned the noodles and the noodles burned the chef. In many circumstances, sufferers are able to use inference about the world to determine the most likely option. The difficulty is not in the meaning of the individual words- most sufferers still know the definitions of words likechef and noodles, but with the relationships between those words.

Broca's aphasics typically have slow and hard to understand speech, stringing together individual nouns and adjectives with very few function words and little pluralization. This is also one of the major differences between Wernicke's aphasia and Broca's aphasia. Those with Wernicke's aphasia typically speak in full sentences with semi-coherent contents that may not be relevant to the topic. For example, a person with Broca's aphasia may say "Boy... down.. taking... cookie", while a person with Wernicke's aphasia describing the same scene may say "Mother is away working her work out of here, but when she's looking in the other part. One their small tile into their time here."
