= Sulcus of auditory tube =

Groove in the base of the skull fitting the Eustachian canal

Details

Identifiers
- Latin: sulcus tubae auditivae, sulcus tubae auditoriae
- TA98: A02.1.05.041
- TA2: 627
- FMA: 75761

The lateral half of the great wing of the sphenoid bone articulates, by means of a synchondrosis, with the petrous part of the temporal bone. Between these two bones on the under surface of the skull, is a furrow, the sulcus of auditory tubule, for the lodgement of the cartilaginous part of the auditory tube.
