= Scott D. Sampson =

Canadian paleontologist

- Born: Scott Donald Sampson; April 22, 1961 (age 65); Vancouver, British Columbia, Canada
- Citizenship: Canadian · American
- Education: University of Toronto, University of British Columbia
- Scientific career
- Fields: Paleontology, Science Communication
- Workplaces: Natural History Museum of Utah Science World British Columbia Denver Museum of Nature and Science Utah Museum of Natural History California Academy Of Sciences

Personal details
- Spouse: Toni Sampson
- Children: 2

Scott Donald Sampson (born April 22, 1961) is a Canadian-American paleontologist and science communicator. Sampson was the Executive Director of California Academy of Sciences in San Francisco, California from September 2019 to May 2026. Previously, he was previously Vice President of Research & Collections and Chief Curator at the Denver Museum of Nature & Science. Sampson is notable for his work on the carnivorous theropod dinosaurs Majungasaurus and Masiakasaurus and his extensive research into the Late Cretaceous Period, particularly in Madagascar. He is also known as the host of the “Dinosaur Discoveries” segments on the PBS Kids show Dinosaur Train.

== Background ==
Sampson was born in the neighborhood of Dunbar-Southlands in Vancouver, British Columbia. His father Donald Louis Gilmour Sampson was a social psychology professor at the University of British Columbia. He died of colon cancer when Scott was 13 years old.He attended Point Grey Secondary School. Sampson studied for a Ph.D. in Zoology from the University of Toronto. For his doctorate he produced a thesis on two newly found species of ceratopsids, dated to the Late Cretaceous period in Montana and the growth and function of ceratopsid horns and frills. Sampson graduated from the University of Toronto in 1993 and worked for a year at the American Museum of Natural History in New York City. Then he worked for five years as an assistant professor of anatomy at the New York College of Osteopathic Medicine on Long Island. In 1999 he accepted positions as assistant professor in the Department of Geology and Geophysics and curator of vertebrate paleontology at the Utah Museum of Natural History (nowadays called the Natural History Museum of Utah and relocated in the new Rio Tinto Center as of 2011). Sampson resided in California at this time, but continued his research with the Utah museum as a research curator. In February 2013, Sampson took a position as Vice President of Research and Collections at the Denver Museum of Nature and Science.

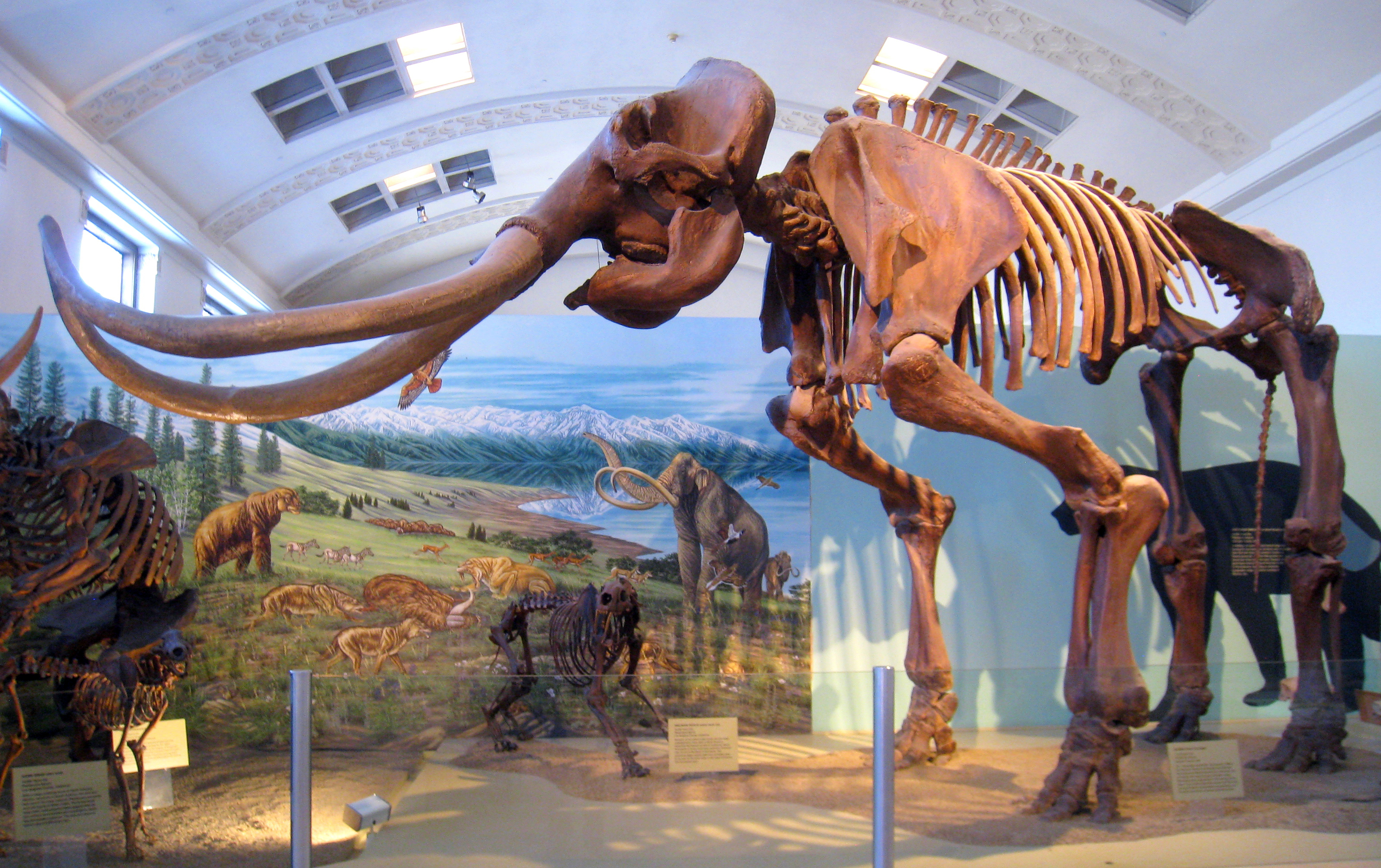
Utah Museum of Natural History where Sampson has been a curator since 1999. As seen in the photograph these former exhibits were dismantled in 2011 when the museum moved to the new Rio Tinto Center and changed name to Natural History Museum of Utah.

Sampson is featured as the host of the “Dinosaur Discoveries” segments on the PBS television series, Dinosaur Train. In one segment, he mentions that he discovered some of Masiakasaurus’ first bones and named it. In 2003, he hosted Dinosaur Planet, a series of four animated nature documentaries which aired on the Discovery Channel. The series was narrated by Christian Slater. His first book, Dinosaur Odyssey: Fossil Threads in the Web of Life was published by University of California Press in 2009. The book, aimed at the general public reconstructs the odyssey of the dinosaurs from their origins on the supercontinent of Pangaea, and explores the way in which dinosaurs ecologically interacted in an expansive web of relationships with other organisms and their natural environment, underscoring "paradigm shifts", which conceptualize the nature of the dinosaurian world.

== Research ==
Aside from his research conducted in museums, Sampson has undertaken paleontological fieldwork in countries such as Zimbabwe, South Africa and Madagascar as well as the United States and Canada. His specialist fields of research include phylogenetics, functional morphology, and evolution of Late Cretaceous dinosaurs. Sampson is particularly notable for his work on the carnivorous theropod dinosaur Majungasaurus and his studies into the paleobiogeography of Gondwana. In 1995 he made a phylogenetic analysis of the Centrosaurinae and Ceratopsidae in the state of Montana and produced two papers on these horned dinosaurs of the Late Cretaceous. Sampson also published a paper documenting the discovery of the first Tyrannosaurus specimen found in Utah, as well as the first evidence of coexistence between Tyrannosaurus and sauropods.

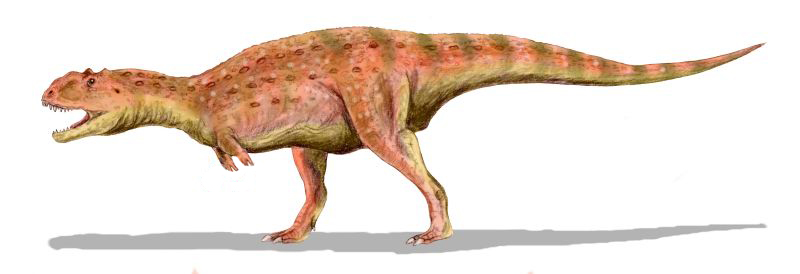
Majungasaurus. Sampson has studied fossils of this dinosaur in Madagascar

In 1998 he conducted thorough paleontological studies into the Cretaceous period in Madagascar and published several papers on it. These include Predatory dinosaur remains from Madagascar: Implications for the Cretaceous biogeography of Gondwana. and The theropodan ancestry of birds: New evidence from the Late Cretaceous of Madagascar, both published in 1998. In 2001 he returned to Madagascar and conducted some important research into the evolution of Gondwanan theropods, publishing a paper on it, entitled A bizarre predatory dinosaur from Madagascar: implications for the evolution of Gondwanan theropods. In 2007 he published Dental morphology and variation in Majungasaurus crenatissimus (Theropoda: Abelisauridae) from the Late Cretaceous of Madagascar.

Sampson stresses the importance of evolution in understanding the dynamics of ecology in everyday life and that is underplayed in modern society:

"The web of life is composed of two distinctly different kinds of threads‹those that link organisms at any given moment in time through the flow of energy (ecology), and those that link all lifeforms through deep time via genetic information and shared common ancestry (evolution). Seen from this dual and complementary perspective, the two themes are inseparable. Without evolution, our vision is severely limited to the present day and we cannot begin to fathom the blossoming of life's diversity from single-celled forebears. Without ecology, the intricate interconnections we share with the current panoply of lifeforms cannot truly be envisioned. United in a single theme, evolution and ecology provide a powerful lens through which to view life's web, forming the foundation of an integrated and underutilized perspective on nature. In short, we need dramatic increases in levels of both ecological literacy, or "ecoliteracy," and evolutionary literacy, or "evoliteracy," with this dynamic pair of concepts reinforcing each other."

Below is a list of taxa that Sampson has contributed to naming:

| Year | Taxon | Authors |
|---|---|---|
| 2024 | Lokiceratops rangiformis gen. et sp. nov. | Loewen, Sertich, Sampson, O'Connor, Carpenter, Sisson, Øhlenschlæger, Farke, Makovicky, Longrich, & Evans |
| 2013 | Nasutoceratops titusi gen. et sp. nov. | Sampson, Lund, Loewen, Farke, & Clayton |
| 2010 | Kosmoceratops richardsoni gen. et sp. nov. | Sampson, Loewen, Farke, Roberts, Forster, Smith, & Titus |
| 2010 | Utahceratops gettyi gen. et sp. nov. | Sampson, Loewen, Farke, Roberts, Forster, Smith, & Titus |
| 2010 | Coahuilaceratops magnacuerna gen. et sp. nov. | Loewen, Sampson, Lund, Farke, Aguillón-Martínez, De Leon, Rodríguez-de la Rosa, Getty, & Eberth |
| 2007 | Gryposaurus monumentensis sp. nov. | Gates & Sampson |
| 2007 | Velafrons coahuilensis gen. et sp. nov. | Gates, Sampson, Delgado De Jesús, Zanno, Eberth, Hernandez-Rivera, Aguillón Martínez, & Kirkland |
| 2005 | Hagryphus giganteus gen. et sp. nov. | Zanno & Sampson |
| 2005 | Falcarius utahensis gen. et sp. nov. | Kirkland, Zanno, Sampson, Clark, & DeBlieux |
| 1998 | Vorona berivotrensis gen. et sp. nov. | Forster, Chiappe, Krause, & Sampson |

== Bibliography ==
| Year | Title | Publisher | ISBN | Pages | Note |
|---|---|---|---|---|---|
| 2009 | Dinosaur Odyssey: Fossil Threads in the Web of Life | University of California Press | 978-0-5202-4163-3 | 352 | |
| 2015 | How to Raise a Wild Child: The Art and Science of Falling in Love with Nature | Houghton Mifflin Harcourt | 978-0-5442-7932-2 | 352 | |
| 2017 | You Can Be A Paleontologist!: Discovering Dinosaurs with Dr. Scott | National Geographic Kids | 978-1-4263-2728-5 | 32 | Illustrated |

== Selected publications ==
- Sampson, S. D. 1995. Two new horned dinosaurs from the Upper Cretaceous Two Medicine Formation of Montana; with a phylogenetic analysis of the Centrosaurinae (Ornithischia: Ceratopsidae). Journal of Vertebrate Paleontology, 15(4): 743–760.
- Sampson, S. D. (1995). "Horns, herds, and hierarchies". Natural History. 104 (6): 36–40.
- Forster, C. A.; Chiappe, L. M.; Krause, D. W.; Sampson, S. D. (1996). "The first Cretaceous bird from Madagascar" (PDF). Nature. 382 (6591): 532–534. Bibcode:1996Natur.382..532F. doi:10.1038/382532a0. S2CID 4364184.
- Sampson, S. D.; Krause, D. W.; Dodson, P.; Forster, C. A. (1996). "The premaxilla of Majungasaurus (Dinosauria: Theropoda), with implications for Gondwanan paleobiogeography". Journal of Vertebrate Paleontology. 16 (4): 601–605. Bibcode:1996JVPal..16..601S. doi:10.1080/02724634.1996.10011350. JSTOR 4523759.
- Sampson, S. D.; Ryan, M. J.; Tanke, D. H. (1997). "Craniofacial ontogeny in centrosaurine dinosaurs (Ornithischia: Ceratopsidae): taxonomic and behavioral implications". Zoological Journal of the Linnean Society. 121 (3): 293–337. doi:10.1111/j.1096-3642.1997.tb00340.x.
- Sampson, S. D.; Witmer, L. M.; Forster, C. A.; Krause, D. W.; O'Connor, P. M.; Dodson, P.; Ravoavy, F. (1998). "Predatory dinosaur remains from Madagascar: implications for the Cretaceous biogeography of Gondwana" (PDF). Science. 280 (5366): 1048–1051. Bibcode:1998Sci...280.1048S. doi:10.1126/science.280.5366.1048. PMID 9582112.
- Forster, C. A.; Sampson, S. D.; Chiappe, L. M.; Krause, D. W. (1998). "The theropod ancestry of birds: new evidence from the Late Cretaceous of Madagascar" (PDF). Science. 279 (5358): 1915–1919. Bibcode:1998Sci...279.1915F. doi:10.1126/science.279.5358.1915. PMID 9506938.
- Witmer, L. M.; Sampson, S. D.; Solounias, N. (1999). "The proboscis of tapirs (Mammalia: Perissodactyla): a case study in novel narial anatomy" (PDF). Journal of Zoology. 249 (3): 249–267. doi:10.1111/j.1469-7998.1999.tb00763.x.
- Sampson, S. D. (1999). "Sex and destiny: the role of mating signals in speciation and macroevolution". Historical Biology. 13 (2–3): 173–197. Bibcode:1999HBio...13..173S. doi:10.1080/08912969909386580.
- Sampson, S. D.; Carrano, M. T.; Forster, C. A. (2001). "A bizarre predatory dinosaur from the Late Cretaceous of Madagascar". Nature. 409 (6819): 504–506. Bibcode:2001Natur.409..504S. doi:10.1038/35054046. PMID 11206544. S2CID 205013285.
- Carrano, M. T.; Sampson, S. D.; Forster, C. A. (2002). "The osteology of Masiakasaurus knopfleri, a small abelisauroid (Dinosauria: Theropoda) from the Late Cretaceous of Madagascar". Journal of Vertebrate Paleontology. 22 (3): 510–534. doi:10.1671/0272-4634(2002)022[0510:TOOMKA]2.0.CO;2. S2CID 85655323.
- Krause, D. W.; O'Connor, P. M.; Rogers, K. C.; Sampson, S. D.; Buckley, G. A.; Rogers, R. R. (2006). "Late Cretaceous terrestrial vertebrates from Madagascar: implications for Latin American biogeography" (PDF). Annals of the Missouri Botanical Garden. 93 (2): 178–208. doi:10.3417/0026-6493(2006)93[178:LCTVFM]2.0.CO;2. S2CID 9166607.
- Carrano, M. T.; Sampson, S. D. (2008). "The phylogeny of Ceratosauria (Dinosauria: Theropoda)" (PDF). Journal of Systematic Palaeontology. 6 (2): 183–236. Bibcode:2008JSPal...6..183C. doi:10.1017/S1477201907002246. S2CID 30068953.
- Sampson, S. D.; Loewen, M. A.; Farke, A. A.; Roberts, E. M.; Forster, C. A.; Smith, J. A.; Titus, A. L.; Stepanova, Anna (2010). Stepanova, Anna (ed.). "New Horned Dinosaurs from Utah Provide Evidence for Intracontinental Dinosaur Endemism". PLOS ONE. 5 (9) e12292. Bibcode:2010PLoSO...512292S. doi:10.1371/journal.pone.0012292. PMC 2929175. PMID 20877459.

== Personal life ==
He has two daughters and resides in Muir Beach, California with his wife Toni, a physician.
