= Horizontal fissure of cerebellum =

Horizontal groove in the middle of the cerebellum

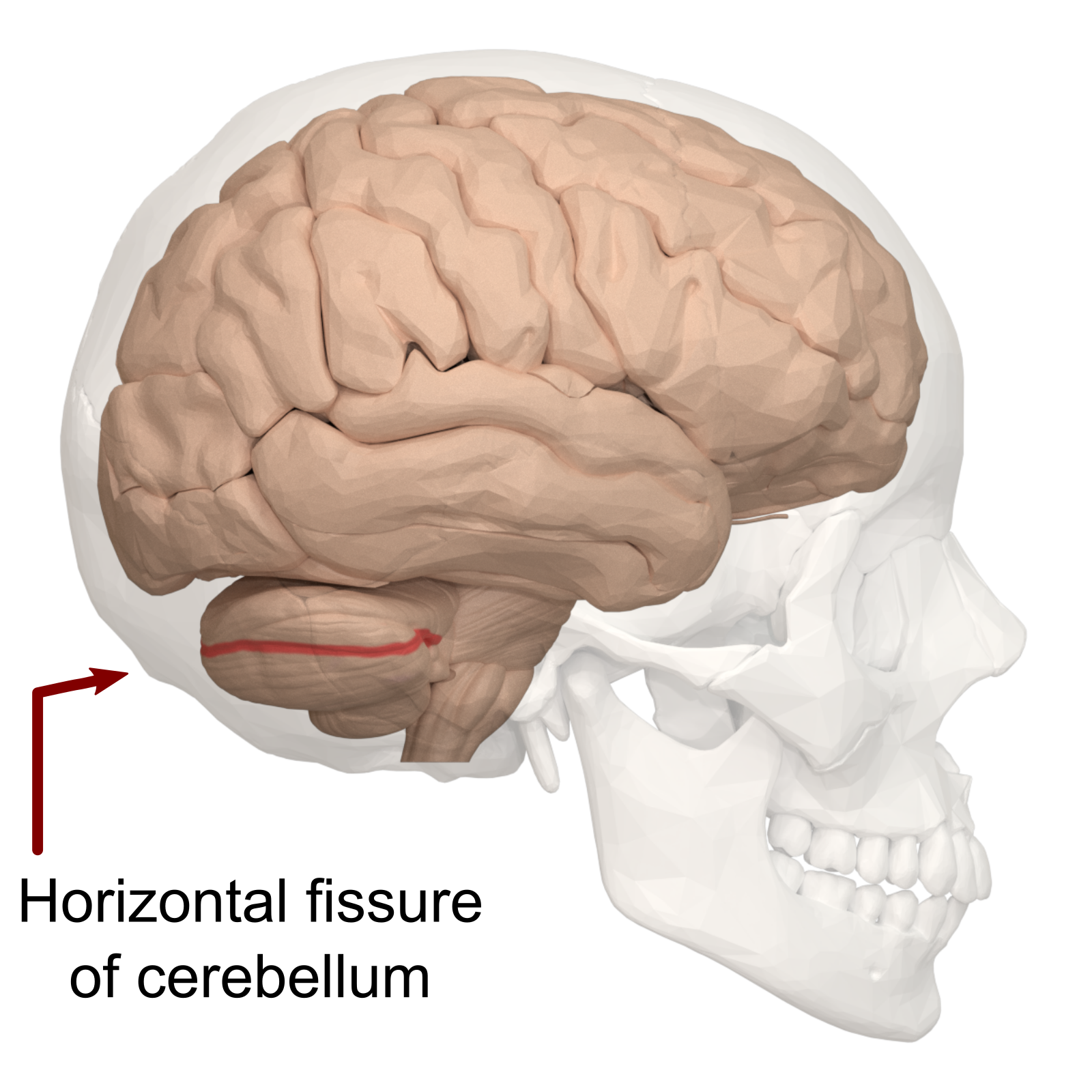
- Lateral view of brain. Horizontal fissure lined in red.
- Dissection video (34 sec)

Details

Identifiers
- Latin: fissura (or sulcus) horizontalis (cerebelli)
- NeuroNames: 661
- NeuroLex ID: nlx_anat_20081255
- TA98: A14.1.07.209
- TA2: 5796
- FMA: 75135

The largest and deepest fissure in the cerebellum is named the horizontal fissure (or horizontal sulcus).

It commences in front of the pons, and passes horizontally around the free margin of the hemisphere to the middle line behind, and divides the cerebellum into an upper and a lower portion.

== Additional images ==
Animation. Horizontal fissure lined in red.

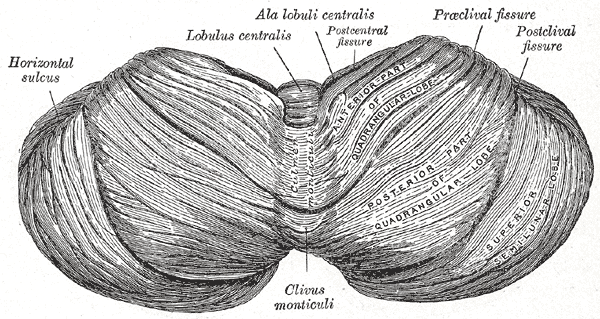
Upper surface of the cerebellum.

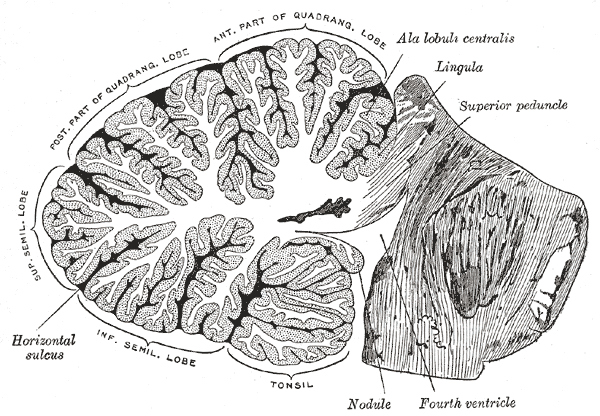
Sagittal section of the cerebellum, near the junction of the vermis with the hemisphere.
