= Matthew Logelin =

American writer

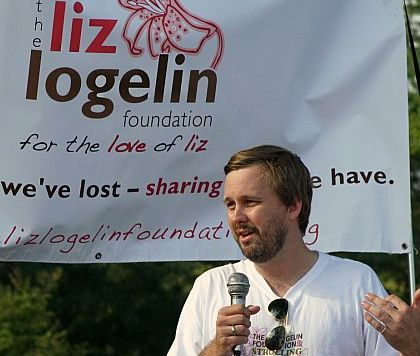
Matthew Logelin addresses the crowd at an event for The Liz Logelin Foundation in 2009.

Matthew Logelin is an American author, blogger, public speaker, and charity founder. In 2011, he published Two Kisses for Maddy: A Memoir of Loss and Love, which was a New York Times Best Seller. His blog, Matt, Liz and Madeline: Life and Death, All in a 27-Hour Period, received over 40,000 hits per day at its height in 2008. Both the blog and the memoir document his grief and sudden single parenthood following the unexpected death of his wife, Liz Logelin, 27 hours after the birth of the couple's first child. A screen adaptation of the memoir starring Kevin Hart and presented by the Obamas premiered on Netflix in 2021. In 2009, Logelin established The Liz Logelin Foundation, a non-profit organization providing financial grants to families with children who have lost a parent. In 2018, he was featured on an episode of the podcast Reply All, where the hosts attempted to help him take down viral ads featuring misrepresentations about his and his wife's story.

== Background ==
Matt Logelin was born to Sara and Tom Logelin and raised in Minnetonka, Minnesota. He has three younger brothers.

He and Elizabeth 'Liz' Goodman met at an area gas station when both were high school seniors. After high school, the two maintained a long-distance relationship while she attended Scripps College in California, and he studied Sociology at St. John's University in their native Minnesota. After graduation, their long-distance dating continued as Logelin pursued a master's degree at Loyola University Chicago. In 2002, rather than continuing on to a PhD in the subject, Logelin opted to move to California to begin life with his high school sweetheart, whom he married on August 13, 2005. Two years later, the Logelins were thrilled to learn they were expecting their first child, but the pregnancy was difficult, and Liz was admitted to the hospital for bed rest.

Following 3 weeks of hospital bedrest, Liz gave birth to a daughter – Madeline Elizabeth Logelin – on March 24, 2008, via an emergency caesarean section. The baby was born healthy although 7 weeks premature. The following afternoon, Liz died suddenly and unexpectedly of a pulmonary embolism.

Before his wife's death, Logelin spent many years working as a Project Manager for Yahoo!, often traveling to India as head of their outsourcing program. He quit his job in 2009 to write Two Kisses for Maddy, a memoir about his experience.

== Matt, Liz, and Madeline: Life and Death, All in a 27 Hour Period ==
Logelin had begun a blog many years before his wife's death. At one time titled simply Matt Logelin.com, it was originally a place to document his photography as they traveled the world together, one of their great hobbies as a couple, as well as amusing experiences at his job. The blog later became a source of information for family and friends once his wife was admitted to the hospital for closer monitoring during her seventh month of pregnancy.

After her death, he kept blogging as an outlet for his grief and a way to document his journey as an unexpected single father to a premature infant. As news of his wife's death spread, Logelin found himself and his blog thrust into the national spotlight. His experience was profiled in People Magazine, on the daytime shows of Rachael Ray and Oprah Winfrey, and in Minneapolis and Los Angeles-area newspapers.

The sudden influx of blog readers who had learned of the tragedy through these media outlets led to Logelin receiving 20-30 packages a day from total strangers. He received formula coupons, diapers, clothing and gifts for his daughter, as well as gift certificates, books, and even beer for himself. His blog comments filled with words of advice and encouragement, his blog building up to tens of thousands of page views per day as he detailed his life with his daughter and reminisced about the nearly 13 years he spent with his wife. "In many ways, it's a love letter to Madeline and to Liz," he said of the blog in 2009, which still receives 15,000 hits a day.

== Two Kisses for Maddy ==
In 2009, Logelin left his job at Yahoo! and moved to India for two months with his daughter, where he began writing a memoir about his experience. India and its surrounding areas were a place of great significance for both him and his late wife – he had proposed in Kathmandu, Nepal, on the steps of a temple in Durbar Square, and the two had traveled through India together during one of his foreign work assignments, a year after they were married. It was during that trip that they visited the Taj Mahal and, upon hearing the story of how the monument came to be built, his wife turned to him with tears in her eyes and declared, "You would never do something like this for me." The memory impacted Logelin so deeply that it prompted him to write his memoir. "Figuratively speaking, [the book] is my Taj Mahal to her," he explained in 2009. "I'm doing what I can to bring that legacy back for her." Two Kisses for Maddy: A Memoir of Loss and Love details his courtship and marriage, as well as the moments surrounding his wife's death and the first year of his daughter's life without her mother. "Selfishly, I want her to know her mom through this," he has said.

The memoir was edited by Amanda Englander of Grand Central Publishing, and published by GCP in April 2011, reaching #24 on the New York Times Best Seller list and #11 on the eBook list. An audio book read by Logelin was released as well. In April 2012, a paperback version with an added chapter, additional photographs, and a reading group guide was made available.

Following its publication, Logelin was asked to appear as the keynote speaker for the Gaithersburg Book Festival in Maryland, as well as the Vascular Disease Foundation's annual meeting. He spoke on a panel with such writers as Dan Fante and Emma Forrest at the 2011 West Hollywood Book Fair, as well as at his late wife's alma mater, Scripps College, during a nationwide book tour. He has written an original article for the Huffington Post and has received extensive media coverage since publication, including appearing on Fox and Friends, BBC Outlook, Minneapolis' Kare 11, multiple radio shows, and in Los Angeles Magazine.

The book was adapted into the film Fatherhood starring Kevin Hart as a version of Matt. The film premiered on Netflix on June 18, 2021.

== The Liz Logelin Foundation ==
In 2009, a group of early blog readers planned a 5K Walk/Run in honor of Logelin's late wife, who was a runner. The event brought in over $4,000, and while it was intended to go to Logelin and his daughter, he instead donated the money to other widowed families he had met through his blog. This inspired him to establish The Liz Logelin Foundation, in honor of his wife. As of 2010, the foundation had given out $20,000 to grieving families and has been featured on numerous media outlets, including CBS This Morning.

Each year, on the weekend closest to Liz Logelin's birthday, the foundation holds a Celebration of Hope gala, with live and silent auctions. A Walk, Run, Hope 5K, to benefit the organization, is also held annually.

Matt Logelin donates a portion of his book sales – 7%, his late wife's lucky number – to the foundation.

== Work with widowed individuals ==
Matt Logelin has worked extensively with people who have lost a partner. In 2011, he was one of the presenters at Camp Widow, a weekend learning retreat for those who have lost a spouse, leading a workshop on revisiting places that held significance in the relationship, just as he had experienced during his short-term move to India. He also spoke to the National Conference on Widowhood in 2009, as well as appeared on Voice of America's Healing the Grieving Heart radio show. He has guest-posted not only as a widower, but as a single parent, on a variety of blogs, including Glamour Magazine.

As Logelin lost his wife so shortly after childbirth, he is also frequently cited in news stories regarding the rising national maternal mortality rate, and has been interviewed by Amnesty International, in hopes of raising awareness of postpartum complications.

== See also ==
- The Liz Logelin Foundation
