= Battle at Big Rock =

- Promotional release poster
- Based on: Jurassic Park by Michael Crichton
- Written by: Emily Carmichael; Colin Trevorrow
- Directed by: Colin Trevorrow
- Starring: André Holland; Natalie Martinez; Melody Hurd; Pierson Salvador; Chris Finlayson; Noah Cole; Ethan Cole
- Music by: Amie Doherty
- Country of origin: United States
- Original language: English

Production
- Producers: Patrick Crowley; Frank Marshall
- Cinematography: Larry Fong
- Editors: Stephen M. Rickert, Jr.
- Running time: 8 minutes
- Production company: Amblin Entertainment

Original release
- Network: FX
- Release: September 15, 2019

Battle at Big Rock is a 2019 American short film directed by Colin Trevorrow. It is part of the Jurassic Park franchise and follows the events of Jurassic World: Fallen Kingdom (2018). It stars André Holland, Natalie Martinez, Melody Hurd, and Pierson Salvador. The short premiered on FX on September 15, 2019 and was subsequently released online. It received generally positive reviews from critics.

== Plot ==
Set one year after the events of Jurassic World: Fallen Kingdom, a blended family from Oakland, California goes on a camping trip at the fictional Big Rock National Park in Northern California, approximately 20 mi (32 km) from where dinosaurs from Fallen Kingdom were let loose. The film chronicles the first major confrontation between humans and the dinosaurs.

At their campsite, the family is dining in their RV when they are suddenly greeted by a Nasutoceratops and its baby. To their horror, an Allosaurus emerges and attacks the baby, leading to a battle with the adult. A second adult joins the fight, and the two prevail against the Allosaurus, fleeing into the woods with their baby. The Allosaurus proceeds to attack the family's RV after hearing their infant crying. Upon destroying the RV, the family begin to fear for the worst. To their relief, the daughter shoots the Allosaurus in its head with crossbows, which causes the dinosaur to flee. They embrace, though are in complete shock over what just happened.

During the closing credits, found footage clips of dinosaurs and other creatures are shown including a pack of Compsognathus chasing after a scared little girl, a Stegosaurus causing a car to swerve and drive off a cliff, fishermen in a boat peacefully passing by a Parasaurolophus on the banks of a river, a Mosasaurus eating a great white shark after the shark eats a seal, and a Pteranodon swooping at a dove that had just been released at a wedding.

== Cast ==
- André Holland as Dennis, the father of the family
- Natalie Martinez as Mariana, the mother of the family
- Melody Hurd as Kadasha, Dennis's daughter
- Pierson Salvador as Mateo, Mariana's son
- Chris Finlayson as Greg, a friend of the family
- Noah and Ethan Cole as Dennis and Mariana's baby son and Kadasha and Mateo's half-brother

== Production ==
=== Development ===
The idea for the film originated when Universal Studios asked Trevorrow if he would be interested in making a potential Jurassic World short film, and he accepted. Trevorrow wrote the short film with Emily Carmichael, who was already working with him to write Jurassic World Dominion (2022). The short film's story remained the same throughout the project's history, as Trevorrow believed the next logical step for the franchise would be for campers to encounter dinosaurs following the events of Jurassic World: Fallen Kingdom.

To maintain secrecy on the project, no auditions or casting calls were held. A casting director who knew Trevorrow helped lead a secretive search for the child actors. The film marked Melody Hurd's acting debut. Trevorrow chose André Holland and Natalie Martinez as he admired their acting in other films.

=== Filming ===
Filming took place in Ireland in January 2019. Filming locations included Powerscourt Estate. Ireland was chosen as redwood trees outside Dublin resembled national parks in northern California. Filming took place with a small crew over the course of five days. Larry Fong was the film's cinematographer. Much of the film was shot using a hand-held camera, as Trevorrow wanted to see if audiences would accept such a filmmaking style in a Jurassic Park film, which he later felt they did.

Industrial Light & Magic created CGI dinosaurs for the film, as well as reference maquettes, while John Rosengrant of Legacy Effects created an animatronic Allosaurus. The film had a much smaller budget than the full films in the Jurassic Park franchise. Originally, the film was going to be shorter than eight minutes. After filming concluded, Trevorrow decided to add end-credit scenes depicting dinosaurs. Because he could not film any new scenes, he instead searched through YouTube videos that could be integrated into the film. The rights to each of the online videos were purchased for use in the short film, and dinosaurs were then added into the videos.

== Music ==
Amie Doherty composed the film's score. Doherty was contacted in October 2018 about composing Battle at Big Rock. She met with Trevorrow in December, and was chosen to compose the film. After filming concluded, Doherty's score changed slightly over the next four months as the film underwent editing. Doherty said the score was mainly tightened to fit in with the events depicted in the film. The musical recording process took place at Abbey Road Studios, where an 80-piece orchestra recorded the score in May 2019.

== Release ==
Battle at Big Rock was announced on September 10, 2019, and it premiered five days later on FX. Trevorrow was surprised at the amount of secrecy maintained on the project up until the announcement. Mattel had released toys for the film prior to its release, and a fan site had also learned of the film, but its existence otherwise remained largely unknown. After its television premiere, Battle at Big Rock was released online through YouTube, as well as JurassicWorld.com and the website for NBC. The short film was initially scheduled to accompany the theatrical release of Universal's Hobbs & Shaw in August 2019. The short film was included on the Blu-ray and DVD releases of Jurassic World Dominion (which was exclusively in North America, Japan, China, English, French, Dutch, German and Italian speaking countries).

== Reception ==
=== Critical response ===
Battle at Big Rock received acclaim from critics and fans alike.

Stuart Heritage of The Guardian called it, "...by far the best in the [Jurassic World] series..." Julia Alexander of The Verge claimed, "[the film] has everything a Jurassic Park fan would want..."

Charles Pulliam-Moore of io9 described it as "solid". Josh Millican of Dread Central described it as "...a tasty little treat..." Mike Reyes of CinemaBlend described it as "a sight to see".

== See also ==
- List of films featuring dinosaurs
