= Them (TV series) =

American horror anthology television series (2021–2024)

- Season 1 promotional poster
- Genre: Horror; Psychological horror; Drama; Anthology
- Created by: Little Marvin
- Starring: Deborah Ayorinde; Ashley Thomas; Alison Pill; Shahadi Wright Joseph; Melody Hurd; Ryan Kwanten; Pam Grier; Luke James; Joshua J. Williams; Jeremy Bobb
- Composer: Mark Korven
- Country of origin: United States
- Original language: English
- No. of seasons: 2
- No. of episodes: 18

Production
- Executive producers: Little Marvin; David Matthews; Roy Lee; Miri Yoon; Lena Waithe; Don Kurt; Nelson Cragg; Larysa Kondracki; Michael Connolly
- Producers: Dominic Orlando; Michael Nelson
- Cinematography: Checco Varese; Xavier Grobet; Suki Medencevic
- Editors: Jeff Israel; David Kashevaroff; Kevin D. Ross; Genevieve Butler; Daniel Downer III; Andrew Parkhurst; Daniel Williams
- Camera setup: Single-camera
- Running time: 33–55 minutes
- Production companies: Vertigo Entertainment; Hillman Grad Productions; Odd Man Out; Amazon Studios; Sony Pictures Television (Note: Credited as Sony Pictures Television Studios in season 1.)

Original release
- Network: Amazon Prime Video
- Release: April 9, 2021 – present

Them is an American horror anthology television series created by Little Marvin. Consisting of two seasons, each with a self-contained story but both taking place in the same universe, and with Deborah Ayorinde in the lead role as different characters. The first season co-starred Ashley Thomas, Alison Pill, and Ryan Kwanten, and the second, Pam Grier, Luke James, Joshua J. Williams and Jeremy Bobb.

The first season, subtitled Covenant, premiered on Amazon Prime Video on April 9, 2021, and the second, The Scare, premiered on April 25, 2024.

== Plot ==
Set in 1953, Them: Covenant follows a black family who move from North Carolina to an all-white neighborhood in East Compton during the Second Great Migration. The family's initially idyllic home by degrees transforms into an epicenter of evil forces, both mundane and otherworldly.

Them: The Scare, set in 1991, centers on LAPD Detective Dawn Reeve, who is assigned to a new case: a gruesome murder that leaves the hardened detectives shaken. As Dawn investigates, a malevolent force inflicts itself on the detective and her family.

== Cast and characters ==
=== Covenant (2021) ===
==== Main ====
- Deborah Ayorinde as Livia "Lucky" Emory, a housewife whose black family moves to an all-white neighborhood
- Ashley Thomas as Henry Emory, Lucky's husband and an engineer
- Alison Pill as Elizabeth "Betty" Wendell, a racist housewife very involved in neighborhood activities who makes it her mission to drive the Emorys out.
- Shahadi Wright Joseph as Ruby Lee Emory, Lucky and Henry's daughter and oldest child
- Melody Hurd as Gracie Emory, Lucky and Henry's younger daughter
- Ryan Kwanten as George Bell, a milkman on whom Betty has a secret crush

==== Guest ====
- Dale Dickey as The Woman
- Liam McIntyre as Clarke Wendell
- Lindsey Kraft as Midge Pruitt
- Pat Healy as Marty Dixon
- Brooke Smith as Helen Koistra
- Malcolm Mays as Calvin
- John Patrick Jordan as Earl (Note: Credited as Earl Denton in episode 8)
- Dirk Rogers as Miss Vera
- Abbie Cobb as Nat Dixon
- Max Barsness as Dale Pruitt
- Kim Shaw as Carol Lynn Denton
- Bailey Noble as Marlene
- Derek Phillips as Sergeant Bull Wheatley
- P. J. Byrne as Stuart Berks
- Sophie Guest as Doris
- Tim Russ as The Custodian
- Ryan Kennedy as Gary
- Christopher Heyerdahl as The Black Hat Man, an entity in the appearance of an elderly white bearded man who haunts the Emorys
- Jeremiah Birkett as Da Tap Dance Man, an entity in the appearance of a black man in make-up, who appears to Henry
- Paula Jai Parker as Hazel Emory
- Sheria Irving as Cynthia
- J. Mallory McCree as Junius Emory
- Anika Noni Rose as Ella Mae
- Roland Johnson as Moe Irvin
- Lisa Banes as Esther Haber, in her final television role before her death on June 14, 2021.
- Michael Harney as Otto Haber
- Peter Mackenzie as Mr. Stoal
- Shaw Jones as City Planner
- Van Epperson as Banker
- Barry Livingston as Real Estate Commissioner
- David Bowe as Mitch
- Christopher Murray as Murray
- Daniel Robbins as Man in Car
- Scott Alan Smith as Fuller
- Latarsha Rose as Arnette Beaumont
- Samantha Sherman as Marjorie Wallinger
- Kate McNeil as Dr. Frances Moynihan
- Dominic Burgess as Roger
- Nona Parker Johnson
- Cranston Johnson
- Melinda Page Hamilton as Elder Sara
- Gene Silvers as Elder Luther
- J. Paul Boehmer as Elder James
- Summera Howell as Elder Cora
- Kai Richard as Miles

=== The Scare (2024) ===
==== Main ====
- Deborah Ayorinde as Detective Dawn Reeve, tasked with investigating a series of strange, gruesome murders
- Pam Grier as Athena Reeve, Dawn's mother
- Luke James as Edmund Gaines, an amateur actor struggling with his career and mental health
- Joshua J. Williams as Kelvin "Kel" Reeve, Dawn's son who is in high school
- Jeremy Bobb as Detective Ronald McKinney, Dawn's co-worker with whom she shares a conflictual relationship

==== Guest ====
- Iman Shumpert as Corey, Dawn's ex-husband and Kel's father
- Malcolm M. Mays as Calvin
- Carlito Olivero as Detective Joaquin Diaz, a recently-appointed detective who assists Dawn
- Brey Howard as Donovan
- Charles Brice as Reggie marks
- Tamika Shannon as Rhonda, a receptionist and Edmund's love interest

== Episodes ==
Series overview
Season	Title	Episodes	Originally released
1	Covenant	10	April 9, 2021
2	The Scare	8	April 25, 2024

=== Season 1: Covenant (2021) ===
No. overall	No. in season	Title	Directed by	Written by	Original release date
1	1	"Day 1"	Nelson Cragg	Little Marvin	April 9, 2021
2	2	"Day 3"	Nelson Cragg	David Matthews & Little Marvin	April 9, 2021
3	3	"Day 4"	Daniel Stamm	Francine Volpe	April 9, 2021
4	4	"Day 6"	Nelson Cragg	Seth Zvi Rosenfeld	April 9, 2021
5	5	"Covenant I."	Janicza Bravo	Little Marvin & Dominic Orlando	April 9, 2021
6	6	"Day 7: Morning"	Craig William Macneill	Christina Ham	April 9, 2021
7	7	"Day 7: Night"	Ti West	David Matthews	April 9, 2021
8	8	"Day 9"	Nelson Cragg	Story by : Francine Volpe; Teleplay by : Francine Volpe and Dominic Orlando	April 9, 2021
9	9	"Covenant II."	Craig William Macneill	Dominic Orlando	April 9, 2021
10	10	"Day 10"	Ti West	Little Marvin	April 9, 2021

=== Season 2: The Scare (2024) ===
No. overall	No. in season	Title	Directed by	Written by	Original release date
11	1	"Are You Scared?"	Craig William Macneill	Little Marvin	April 25, 2024
12	2	"The Devil Himself Visited This Place"	Craig William Macneill	Tony Saltzman & Malcolm M. Mays	April 25, 2024
13	3	"The Man With the Red Hair"	Axelle Carolyn	Scott Kosar & Sarah Cho	April 25, 2024
14	4	"Happy Birthday, Sweet Boy"	Axelle Carolyn	Beverly Okhio	April 25, 2024
15	5	"Luke 8:17"	Guillermo Navarro	Tony Saltzman	April 25, 2024
16	6	"Would You Like to Play a Game?"	Guillermo Navarro	Malcolm M. Mays & Matt Almquist	April 25, 2024
17	7	"One of Us Is Gonna Die Tonight"	Little Marvin	Scott Kosar	April 25, 2024
18	8	"The Box"	Ti West	Little Marvin & Tony Saltzman	April 25, 2024

== Production ==
=== Development ===
On July 28, 2018, Amazon gave the project a two-season order. The series was created by Little Marvin, who also wrote the script for the first season and was set to executive produce the show alongside Lena Waithe under their overall deals with Amazon Studios. Roy Lee, Miri Yoon, and Michael Connolly of Vertigo Entertainment were also announced as executive producers, with Vertigo co-producing the series under the company's deal with Sony Pictures Television. The first season is subtitled Them: Covenant, and the series will follow a similar limited semi-anthological structure to American Horror Story, with each season following a different story with different characters. Alongside the series order announcement, Waithe said:

Little Marvin's script stayed with me for weeks after I read it. He's written something that's provocative and terrifying. The first season will speak to how frightening it was to be black in 1953. It will also remind us that being black in 2018 is just as horrifying. This anthology series will examine the cultural divides among all of us and explore us vs them in a way we've never seen before.

On April 1, 2019, David Matthews joined the series as showrunner under his newly announced overall deal at Sony Pictures Television.

A year and a half after premiering, the cast of the second season, titled The Scare, was announced.

=== Casting ===
On July 27, 2019, Deborah Ayorinde and Ashley Thomas were cast in the lead roles. Shahadi Wright Joseph, Alison Pill, Ryan Kwanten, Melody Hurd, Javier Botet, and Percy Hynes White were added to the main cast on October 3, 2019, alongside Derek Phillips who was cast in a recurring capacity. On December 2, 2019, Brooke Smith, Anika Noni Rose P.J. Byrne, Malcolm Mays, Jeremiah Birkett, and Sophie Guest joined the recurring cast.

For the second season, Deborah Ayorinde returns with the new additions of Pam Grier, Luke James, Joshua J. Williams and Jeremy Bobb as regulars, and Wayne Knight, Carlito Olivero, Charles Brice and Iman Shumpert will recur.

=== Filming ===
The series began production for its first season on July 8, 2019, with filming taking place between Atlanta and Los Angeles.

The set for the first season's neighborhood was built on a lot in Pomona, California.

== Release ==
The series had its world premiere on March 18, 2021, at the SXSW Film Festival as part of the Episodic Premieres section. The series premiered on Amazon Prime Video on April 9, 2021. The second season premiered on April 25, 2024.

== Reception ==
=== Critical response ===
==== Season 1 ====
On review aggregator Rotten Tomatoes, the first season of the series has a 58% fresh rating from 50 critic reviews with an average score of 6.50/10. The site's critical consensus reads "Deborah Ayorinde and Ashley Thomas' gripping performances help Them sustain a sufficient sense of terror, but its blunt and bloody approach undermines any social commentary in favor of more superficial horrors." On Metacritic, the first season of the series received a mixed rating of 57/100 based on 20 critic reviews.

The Guardian's Lucy Mangan gave the show 4/5 stars, writing that "What marks out this portrayal of 50s prejudice (not unworked ground) is that, thanks to magnificent performances from Thomas and Ayorinde, you get a great sense of the cost to victims: the sheer amount of mental energy it takes to navigate a relentlessly hostile world, the consequent exhaustion, the constant abrading of the soul."

In a mostly negative review, Lovia Gyarkye of The Hollywood Reporter said that "Them suffers from an overcrowded narrative and too many themes, making for an uneven, dizzying, at times overly dense viewing experience. From the violent neighbors and the history of black homeownership to the traumas that plague each member of the Emory family, the show takes on more than it can responsibly unpack."

Variety's chief TV critic Daniel D'Addario wrote that "In visual style and in the performances of the actors playing the Emorys, it captures a recognizable 1950s of the mind. A striking early sequence sees the family in integrated settings, being assisted by white employees at an appliance store and a soda fountain. The point is made, elegantly, that the Emorys have left behind the explicit bigotry of the American South for a place where the horrors are more insidious", but described the series as "surprisingly unimaginative".

Some critics took issue with scenes of graphic racial violence, particularly a scene in which a black couple is blinded with hot pokers and burned alive, calling Them "black trauma porn".

==== Season 2 ====
On review aggregator Rotten Tomatoes, the second season of the series has a 100% fresh rating from 11 critic reviews with an average score of 7.30/10. The site's critical consensus reads "A marked improvement with a new story, effective frights and a keen commentary on generational scars, The Scare is a scream."

=== Awards and nominations ===
Year	Award	Category	Nominee(s)	Result	Ref.
2021	SXSW Film Festival Audience Awards	Episodic Premieres	Them	Won	
2021	The ReFrame Stamp Awards	Top 200 Most Popular TV Titles	Them	Won	
2021	Camerimage	Golden Frog - TV Series Competition	Them	Nominated	
2021	Satellite Awards	Best Genre Series	Them	Nominated	
2021	Independent Spirit Awards	Best Male Performance in a New Scripted Series	Ashley Thomas	Nominated	
2021	Independent Spirit Awards	Best Female Performance in a New Scripted Series	Deborah Ayorinde	Nominated	
2021	Writers Guild of America Awards	Television: Long Form – Original	Them	Nominated	

== See also ==
- Get Out - Oscar-winning Jordan Peele film similar in content
- Suburbicon - George Clooney film also similar in content
- United States in the 1950s
