= Melody Hurd =

American actress, model, and dancer (born 2011)

- Born: Prince George's County, Maryland, US
- Occupations: Actress; Model; Dancer
- Years active: 2017–present
- Notable work: Fatherhood; Battle at Big Rock
- Television: Them
- Parents: Fred Hurd II (father); Nisha Hurd (mother)
- Relatives: Lyric Hurd (Sister); Rhythm Hurd (Sister); Tempo Hurd (Sister)

Melody Hurd is an American actress, dancer and model. She gained recognition for her roles in various films and television series and is best known for her starring roles in Fatherhood (2021), Battle at Big Rock (2019), Cross (2024), and Them (2021). In 2025, she received nominations for both an NAACP Image Award and a BET Award.

== Early life ==
Melody Hurd was born in Maryland, US. From a young age, she displayed a keen interest in performing arts. Encouraged by her family, she began her journey in the entertainment industry as a child model before transitioning into acting.

== Career ==
=== Modeling ===
Melody's career began in modeling, where she worked with several notable brands and appeared in various advertisements.

=== Acting ===
Melody made her acting debut in the 2019 short film Battle at Big Rock, directed by Colin Trevorrow. Her performance was well-received, leading to more significant roles in television and film.

She gained wider recognition for her role as Gracie Emory in the Amazon Prime series Them (2021). The horror anthology series allowed her to showcase her range as a young actress, earning her critical acclaim.

In 2021, Melody starred alongside Kevin Hart in the Netflix film Fatherhood, where she played the role of Maddy Logelin. Her performance as the daughter of Hart's character was praised for its emotional depth and maturity.

== Personal life ==
Melody Hurd's family includes her mother, Nisha Hurd, who is also involved in the entertainment industry. Melody has three siblings, Lyric Hurd, Rhythm Hurd and Tempo Hurd.

== Filmography ==
=== Film and TV Movies ===
Year	Title	Role	Notes
2019	Battle at Big Rock	Kadasha	Main cast
2021	Fatherhood	Maddy Logelin	Main cast

=== Television ===
Year	Title	Role	Notes
2016	The Ellen DeGeneres Show	Herself	Episode 38
2021–2024	Them	Gracie Emory	Main cast
2024	Cross	Janelle Cross	Main cast

== Awards and nominations ==
List of Awards and nominations for Melody Hurd
Year	Award	Category	Work	Result	Ref
2025	NAACP Image Awards	Outstanding Performance by a Youth (Series, Special, Television Movie or Limited–Series)	Cross	Nominated	
2025	BET Awards	Young Stars Award	Cross	Nominated	
