= Fatherhood (film) =

2021 film by Paul Weitz

- Official release poster
- Directed by: Paul Weitz
- Screenplay by: Paul Weitz; Dana Stevens
- Story by: Dana Stevens
- Based on: Two Kisses for Maddy: A Memoir of Loss and Love by Matthew Logelin
- Produced by: Marty Bowen; Kevin Hart; David Beaubaire; Peter Kiernan
- Starring: Kevin Hart; Alfre Woodard; Lil Rel Howery; DeWanda Wise; Anthony Carrigan; Paul Reiser
- Cinematography: Tobias Datum
- Edited by: Jonathan Corn
- Music by: Rupert Gregson-Williams
- Production companies: Higher Ground Productions; Bron Creative; Columbia Pictures; Free Association; Temple Hill Entertainment
- Distributed by: Netflix
- Release date: June 18, 2021
- Running time: 109 minutes
- Country: United States
- Language: English
- Budget: $15 million

Fatherhood is a 2021 American comedy-drama film directed by Paul Weitz from a screenplay by Weitz and Dana Stevens based on the 2011 memoir Two Kisses for Maddy: A Memoir of Loss and Love by Matthew Logelin. The film stars Kevin Hart, Alfre Woodard, Frankie R. Faison, Lil Rel Howery, DeWanda Wise, Anthony Carrigan, Melody Hurd, and Paul Reiser, and follows a new father who struggles to raise his daughter after the sudden death of his wife.

Originally scheduled to be released in theaters by Sony Pictures Releasing, Fatherhood was sold to Netflix during the COVID-19 pandemic and was digitally released on June 18, 2021. The film received mixed reviews from critics.

== Plot ==
Childhood sweethearts Matt and Liz Logelin prepare for the birth of their first child. Soon after delivering their daughter, Maddy, Liz suddenly suffers a pulmonary embolism and dies.

Matt is devastated, but is determined to raise Maddy as a single parent. His friends and family, however, are concerned that he may not have the skills or patience to handle raising Maddy alone; Liz's mother, Marion, who has a tense relationship with Matt, feels this the most strongly. After Matt refuses to let her stay for six months to help care for Maddy or move back to his Minnesota hometown, Marion warns him that Maddy needs family and female role models, and that he has to think about what is best for her.

Though Matt initially struggles with the demands of Maddy's care while working full-time, grieving Liz, and suffering from gendered expectations and insensitivity from others who do not respect his role in his daughter's life, he eventually succeeds with the help of friends and fellow parents.

Maddy grows into a confident and tomboyish young girl, while Matt is set up at a party with a mutual friend. Though he is unnerved that her name is Lizzie, they hit it off and begin dating. Though Maddy initially does not like the idea of her father dating, she quickly warms up to Lizzie, and they become friends. But when Maddy is injured on the playground and Matt does not hear the school's phone calls while having sex with Lizzie, he fears that dating her is getting in the way of focusing on Maddy's needs. He breaks up with her, which upsets Maddy.

Matt and Maddy travel back to Minnesota for Marion's birthday. Maddy, beginning to feel the absence of a mother figure in her life more acutely, is overjoyed to be able to stay in her mother's old room and learn more about Liz. Matt, however, is unhappy seeing Liz's room changed, and insists that it is confusing for Maddy. When he tries to leave with her, she insists that she is happier here with family and reminders of her mother. Believing that he has repeatedly failed to understand Maddy's real needs, Matt reluctantly leaves her with her grandparents and returns home alone.

Despite success at work and an anticipated promotion, Matt misses Maddy and blames himself for being a bad father. When in the airport, preparing for a long business trip abroad, Matt is overwhelmed with sights of fatherhood and leaves to go back to Minnesota, where he reunites with Maddy and makes up with her. With Marion's blessing, they return home, where Matt rekindles his relationship with Lizzie.

== Cast ==
- Kevin Hart as Matthew Logelin
- Melody Hurd as Maddy Logelin
- Alfre Woodard as Marion
- Lil Rel Howery as Jordan
- DeWanda Wise as Lizzie Swan
- Anthony Carrigan as Oscar
- Paul Reiser as Howard
- Deborah Ayorinde as Liz Logelin
- Teneisha Collins as Ms. Lillian Burns
- Frankie Faison as Mike

== Production ==
In July 2012, it was reported that Marta Kauffman, Denise Di Novi and Allison Greenspan were developing a television film adaptation of Matthew Logelin's memoir Two Kisses for Maddy: A Memoir of Loss & Love for the Lifetime network. This version did not move forward, and in May 2015, it was announced that Two Kisses for Maddy would be a theatrically released film, with Channing Tatum starring and producing, Dana Stevens writing the screenplay, and TriStar Pictures distributing. In January 2019, it was announced that the film would be titled Fatherhood and star Kevin Hart, replacing Tatum, with Paul Weitz directing and writing his own draft. In May 2019, Melody Hurd and Alfre Woodard were set to star opposite Hart. In June 2019, Anthony Carrigan, Lil Rel Howery, Paul Reiser and Deborah Ayorinde also joined the cast of the film, which had been moved to Columbia Pictures. In July 2019, DeWanda Wise was also added.

== Release ==
Fatherhood was initially scheduled to be released in theaters on April 3, 2020, but on January 6, 2020, it was delayed to January 8, 2021. Later that year, it was pushed back a week to January 15, 2021. On March 30, 2020, it was brought forward to October 23, 2020, due to the COVID-19 pandemic. On April 24, 2020, it was delayed to April 2, 2021, and on November 19, 2020, it was delayed again to April 16, 2021.

It was then announced that Netflix had acquired the worldwide distribution rights (except China) to the film from Sony Pictures Releasing, and set it for streaming release on June 18, 2021. The film was the most-watched item on the service in its first weekend. A week after its release, Netflix reported the film was on track to by watched by 61 million households through its first month of release.

=== Home media ===
Fatherhood was released on Blu-ray, DVD, and Digital HD on June 14, 2022, by Sony Pictures Home Entertainment.

== Reception ==
On the review aggregator website Rotten Tomatoes, the film holds an approval rating of 67% based on 75 reviews, with an average rating of 6.7/10. The site's critics consensus reads, "Fatherhood offers few surprises, but strong work from a smartly assembled cast gives this fact-based story real emotional resonance." According to Metacritic, which assigned a weighted average score of 53 out of 100 based on 18 critics, the film received "mixed or average" reviews.

William Bibbiani of the TheWrap praised Hart's "confidently laid-back and affable lead performance," and wrote, "Perhaps a little too slight to be memorable in the long run, this sensitive and charming tale reassures without, somehow, completely ignoring reality." From The Hollywood Reporter, Lovia Gyarkye called the film "both an effective star vehicle and a tender tearjerker," and said, "Hart, usually known for his comedy... embraces a more dramatic side here, and is surprisingly convincing in these moments."
