= The Liz Logelin Foundation =

US non-profit organization

- Formation: 2009
- Type: 501(c)(3) Non-Profit
- Headquarters: Saint Louis Park, Minnesota, U.S.
- President: Matthew Logelin
- Website: thelizlogelinfoundation.org

The Liz Logelin Foundation was a United States 501(c)(3) nonprofit organization established to financially assist widows and widowers with young families, regardless of parental marital status or sexual orientation. The foundation offers no-strings attached financial grants to those individuals with dependent children who have lost a parent, as well as resources for the newly bereaved. The Liz Logelin Foundation's namesake is Elizabeth 'Liz' (Goodman) Logelin, who died one day after giving birth in 2008. The organization was established in her honor by her husband, Matthew Logelin, to help other grieving families. As of 2011, the foundation has provided grants to over 70 families, reaching over 150 children - according to the site, the foundation shut down after 15 years.

== Organization ==
The Liz Logelin Foundation is a 501(c)(3) non-profit organization. The foundation is headquartered in Saint Louis Park, Minnesota. The foundation's president is Matthew Logelin, who established the foundation after the unexpected death of his wife, Liz Logelin. The Board of Directors include many family and friends of Liz Logelin.

== Mission and services ==
The Liz Logelin Foundation provides financial assistance to young widows and widowers with dependent children under the age of eighteen, with eligibility lasting for a period up to one year (12 months) following the death of parent. The LLF also provides support and resources to the newly bereaved, including a Newly Widowed Checklist, designed to help families navigate life after the loss of a partner and parent.

== History ==
Prior to relocating to Los Angeles, Matt and Liz Logelin were college sweethearts when they first met as teens.

In the spring of 2008, Matthew Logelin began using a personal blog to keep friends and family informed of his expectant wife's condition when she began hospital bed rest. Their daughter, Madeline, was born healthy, though seven weeks premature, on March 24, 2008. Mother and baby appeared to be doing well, but the very next day, 27 hours after Maddy's birth, Logelin's wife, Liz, suddenly collapsed and died of a pulmonary embolism while on the way to hold their newborn for the first time.

Logelin turned to his blog as an outlet for his grief, and a place to share his challenges and triumphs in raising a premature infant without his wife. As news of his wife's death spread, his readership began to grow, with commentators offering advice, encouragement, and sending care packages. In 2009, a group of these readers organized a 5K Walk/Run in memory of Liz Logelin, to be held on her birthday. This first event, which would become an annual event in years to come, was dubbed The Liz Goodman Logelin Memorial 5K and brought in over $4,000. Though intended for Matt Logelin and his daughter, Logelin opted to instead donate the funds to many of the other widows and widowers he'd met through his blog, paving the way for the beginnings of The Liz Logelin Foundation.

The logo for the foundation carries a stargazer lily, his wife's favorite and the flower she chose for their wedding in 2005, as well as a pink font – her favorite color.

In 2009, Matthew Logelin released a memoir, Two Kisses for Maddy: A Memoir of Loss & Love.

=== Netflix film ===
In 2021, Logelin’s story served as the inspiration behind the Netflix film Fatherhood, starring Kevin Hart and Alfre Woodard. Directed by Paul Weitz, the film was released on June 18. It was produced by Sony Pictures alongside Michelle and Barack Obama's production company Higher Ground Productions. The story follows Maddy's first few years of life as Logelin, played by Hart, raises his daughter as a single parent in Boston.

== Funding and success ==
Each year, on the weekend closest to the (September 17) birthday of honoree Liz Logelin, the foundation holds a Celebration of Hope gala featuring live, silent, and online auctions, as well as a 5K Walk/Run/Hope in the Minneapolis, Minnesota area, with proceeds benefiting The Liz Logelin Foundation. The organization also encourages a 5K Walk/Run/Hope Around the World, wherein individuals purchase a race packet, with the proceeds going to the foundation, but walk in their own hometowns.

At the 2011 fundraiser events, The Liz Logelin Foundation raised $46,763.42, an 18 percent increase over the previous year's efforts.

Aside from the annual fall events, The Liz Logelin Foundation advertises a $7 on the 7th Campaign, encouraging individuals to donate $7 on the 7th of each month, Liz Logelin's favorite number. 7 percent of the proceeds from Two Kisses for Maddy: A Memoir of Loss and Love, written by the foundation's president, Matthew Logelin, go toward the Liz Logelin Foundation.

As of 2010, the foundation is supported by 1,700 Donors, spanning 3 countries and 40 states across the U.S. As of 2011, support has reached over 70 families and 150 children, with the money given by the foundation to go to anything the family desires. The average age of an applicant is 35 years old.

The Liz Logelin Foundation has been featured on Network for Good's Non-Profit spotlight, in the Minneapolis-Star Tribune, Kare 11, KCBS-TV Los Angeles, and Fox and Friends.
