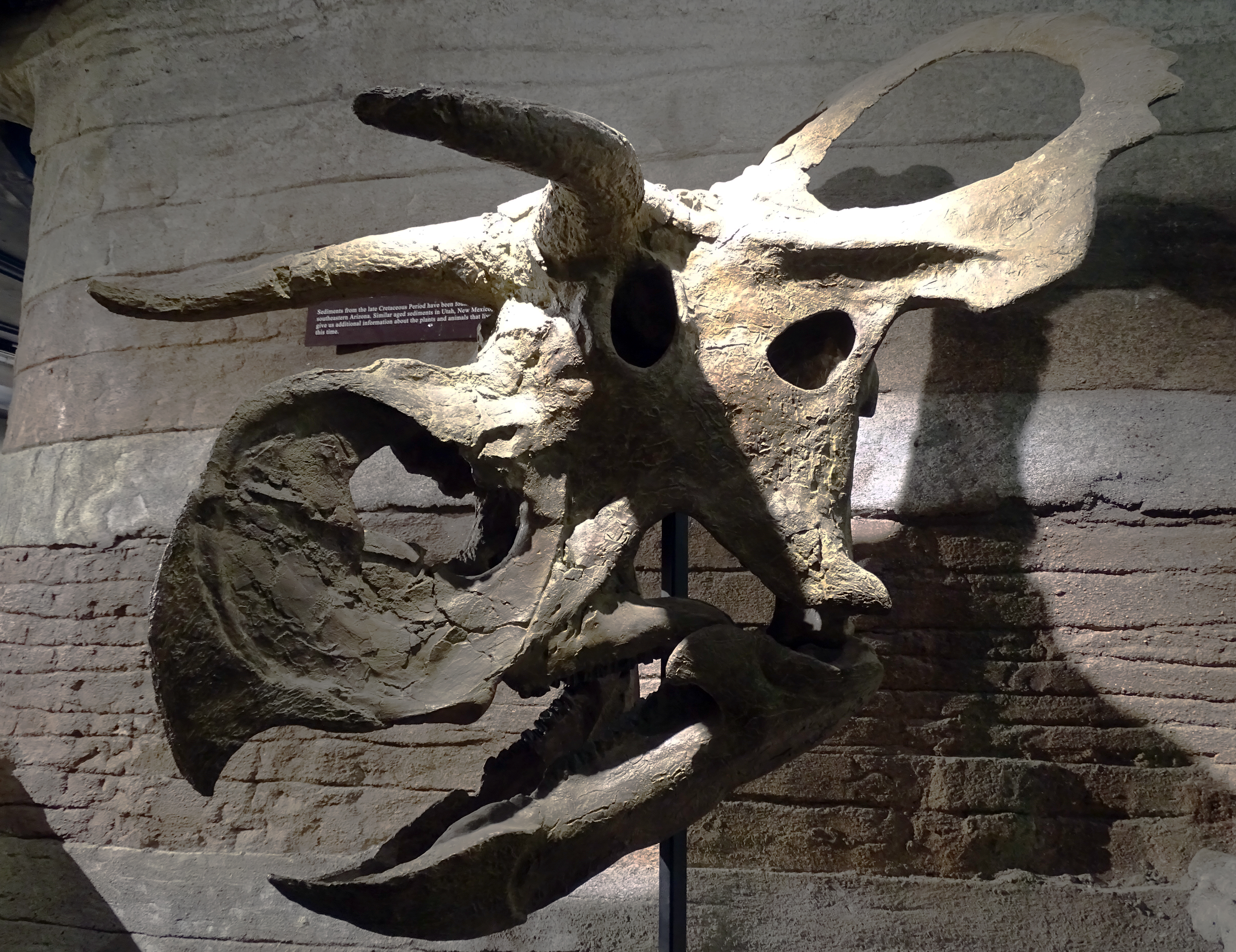
- Reconstructed Nasutoceratops skull at the Arizona Museum of Natural History

Scientific classification
- Kingdom: Animalia
- Phylum: Chordata
- Class: Reptilia
- Clade: Dinosauria
- Clade: †Ornithischia
- Clade: †Ceratopsia
- Family: †Ceratopsidae
- Subfamily: †Centrosaurinae
- Tribe: †Nasutoceratopsini
- Genus: †Nasutoceratops; Sampson et al., 2013

Type species
- †Nasutoceratops titusi Sampson et al., 2013

= Nasutoceratops =

Nasutoceratops Temporal range: Campanian, 75.9–75.5 Ma

Extinct genus of dinosaurs

Nasutoceratops is a genus of ceratopsid dinosaur that lived in North America during the Late Cretaceous period, about 76.0–75.5 million years ago. The first known specimens were discovered in Utah in the Kaiparowits Formation of the Grand Staircase–Escalante National Monument (GSENM) from 2006 onwards, including a subadult skull with both a partial postcranial skeleton and rare skin impressions, and two other partial skulls. In 2013, the subadult was made the holotype of the new genus and species Nasutoceratops titusi; the generic name means "large-nosed horned face", and the specific name honors the paleontologist Alan L. Titus for his work at the GSENM. The dinosaur was noted for its large nose in news reports, and later featured in Jurassic World films.

The holotype skull of Nasutoceratops is approximately 1.5 m (4.9 ft) long; its body length has been estimated at 4.5 m (14.8 ft), and its weight at 1.5 t (1.7 short tons). Nasutoceratops is distinct in features such as the snout region being unusually deep but short from front to back, with the external nostril forming 75% of the skull length in front of the eye sockets. The nasal bones were possibly pneumatized (air-filled), which is unknown in other ceratopsids. Its nasal horn is low and blade-like while the brow horns point forward and are approximately 40% of the total skull length; they are up to 457 mm (18.0 in), the longest known of any centrosaurine, and have been likened to those of a Texas Longhorn bull. The neck frill is almost circular with its widest point at the middle. The epiossifications on the margins of the frill are shaped like low crescents, and there is one at the midline at the top of the frill, unlike in other centrosaurines. Nasutoceratops was a basal (early diverging) member of Centrosaurinae, and may have formed a distinct clade within this group, Nasutoceratopsini, with its closest relatives.

The function of the deep front of the skull of Nasutoceratops is unknown, but may have been related to mastication. The functions of ceratopsian frills and horns have been debated, and include signalling, combat, and species recognition. The forward oriented brow horns of Nasutoceratops may have enabled interlocking with opponents, as in modern bovids. The Kaiparowits Formation dates to the late Campanian age and was deposited on Laramidia, an island continent, when North America was divided at the center by the Western Interior Seaway. This environment was dominated by wetlands and supported a diverse fauna, including other ceratopsians. Based in part on the relationship between Nasutoceratops and other centrosaurines from around the same time, it has been proposed that Laramidia was divided into dinosaur "provinces" with separate endemic species, but this has been contested.

== Discovery and naming ==
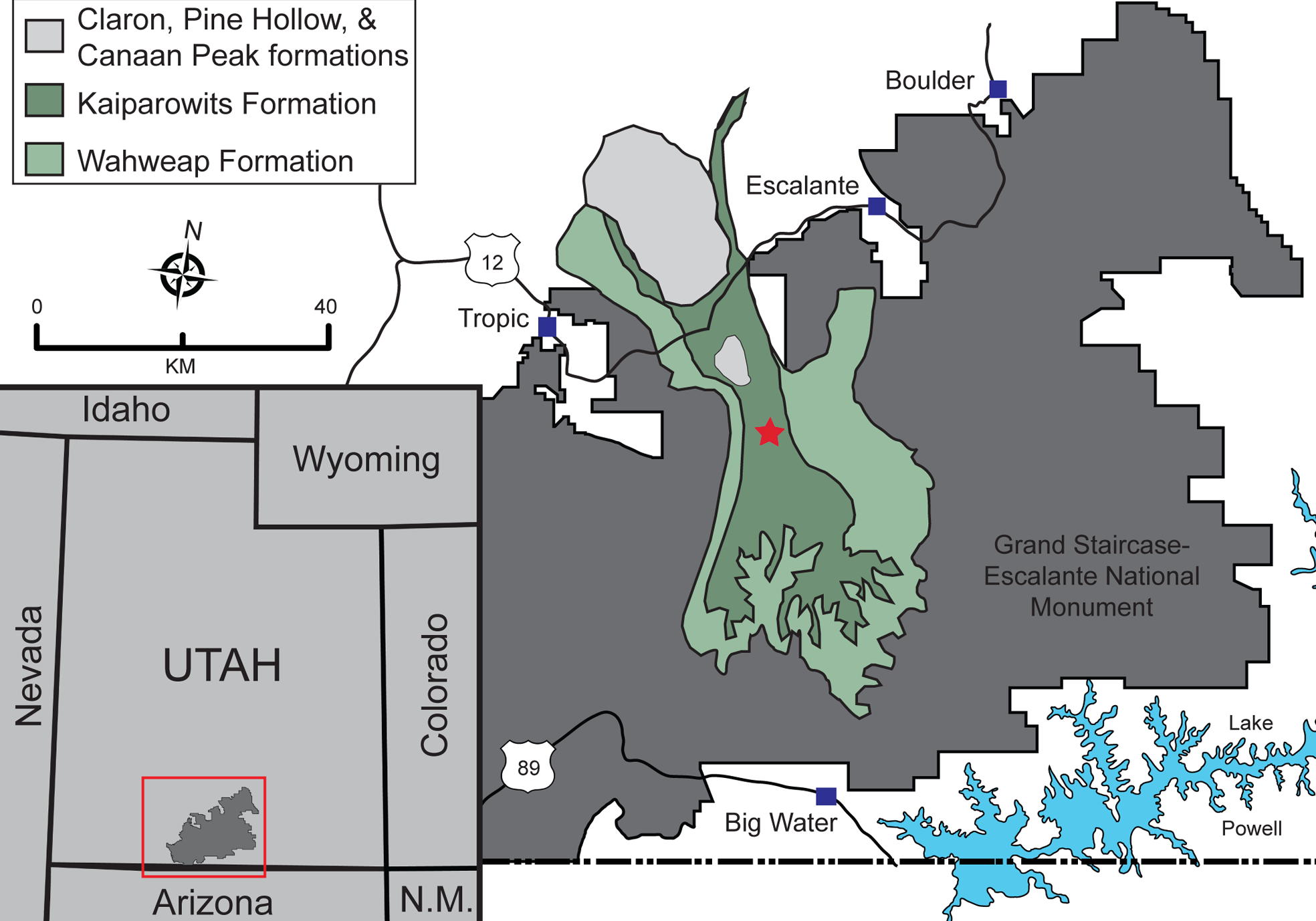
Map showing where Nasutoceratops (★) was found within the Kaiparowits Formation (dark green)

Since 2000, the Natural History Museum of Utah (UMNH) and the Bureau of Land Management have been conducting paleontological surveys of the Kaiparowits Formation at the Grand Staircase–Escalante National Monument (GSENM) in southern Utah. This national monument was established in 1996 in part for the preservation and study of its fossils, and the surveys there have yielded a wide array of unique dinosaur fossils. Field crews from other institutions have also participated, and the collaborative effort is known as the Kaiparowits Basin Project. Among the discoveries that have been made are three new ceratopsian (horned dinosaur) taxa, one of which was identified from UMNH Locality VP 940 discovered by the then graduate student and technician Eric K. Lund during the 2006 field season. Prior to this project, the only ceratopsian remains found in the formation were uninformative, isolated teeth, and centrosaurines were known almost exclusively from the northern part of western North America.

Excavated fossils of the new ceratopsian were transported to the UMNH, where the blocks were prepared by volunteers with pneumatic air scribes and needles and subsequently reassembled; it took a few years for the team to assemble the skull of this dinosaur. It was preliminarily referred to as "Kaiparowits new taxon C" and identified as a centrosaurine (the first member of this ceratopsid group known from the formation) in 2010, and as "Kaiparowits centrosaurine A" in 2013. Three specimens of this dinosaur were collected; UMNH VP 16800 in 2006, and UMNH VP 19469 and UMNH VP 19466 in subsequent years.

The paleontologists Scott D. Sampson, Lund, Mark A. Loewen, Andrew A. Farke, and Katherine E. Clayton briefly described and scientifically named the new genus and species Nasutoceratops titusi in 2013, with specimen UMNH VP 16800 as the holotype (on which the scientific name is based). The generic name is derived from the Latin word nasutus meaning "large-nosed", and ceratops, which means "horned face" in Latinized Greek. The specific name titusi is an eponym that honors the paleontologist Alan L. Titus for his important efforts in recovering fossils from the GSENM. Lund had informally used the spelling Nasutuceratops for this dinosaur in his 2010 thesis wherein he also described it. In 2016, Lund, Sampson, and Loewen published a more detailed description of the preserved fossil material.

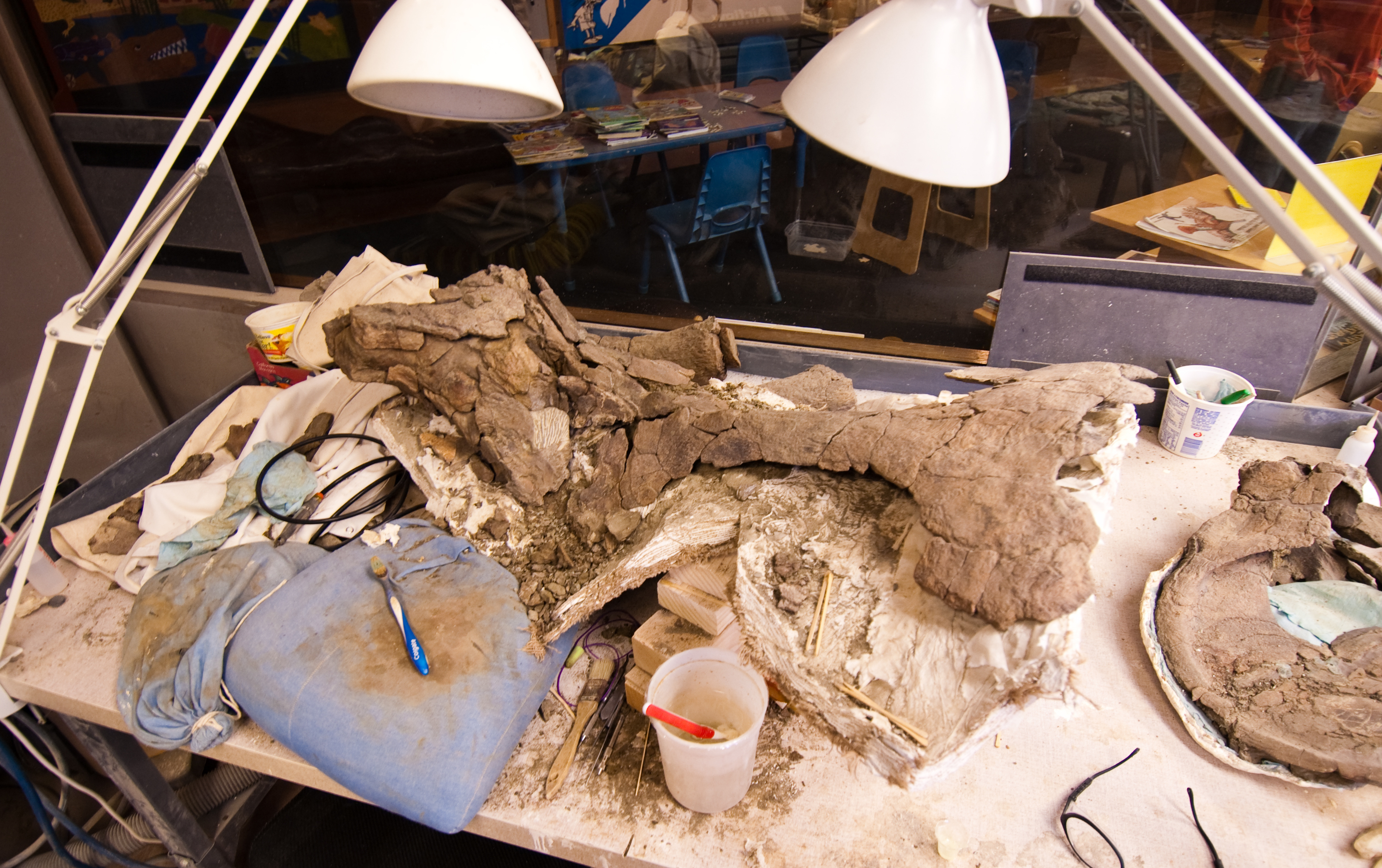
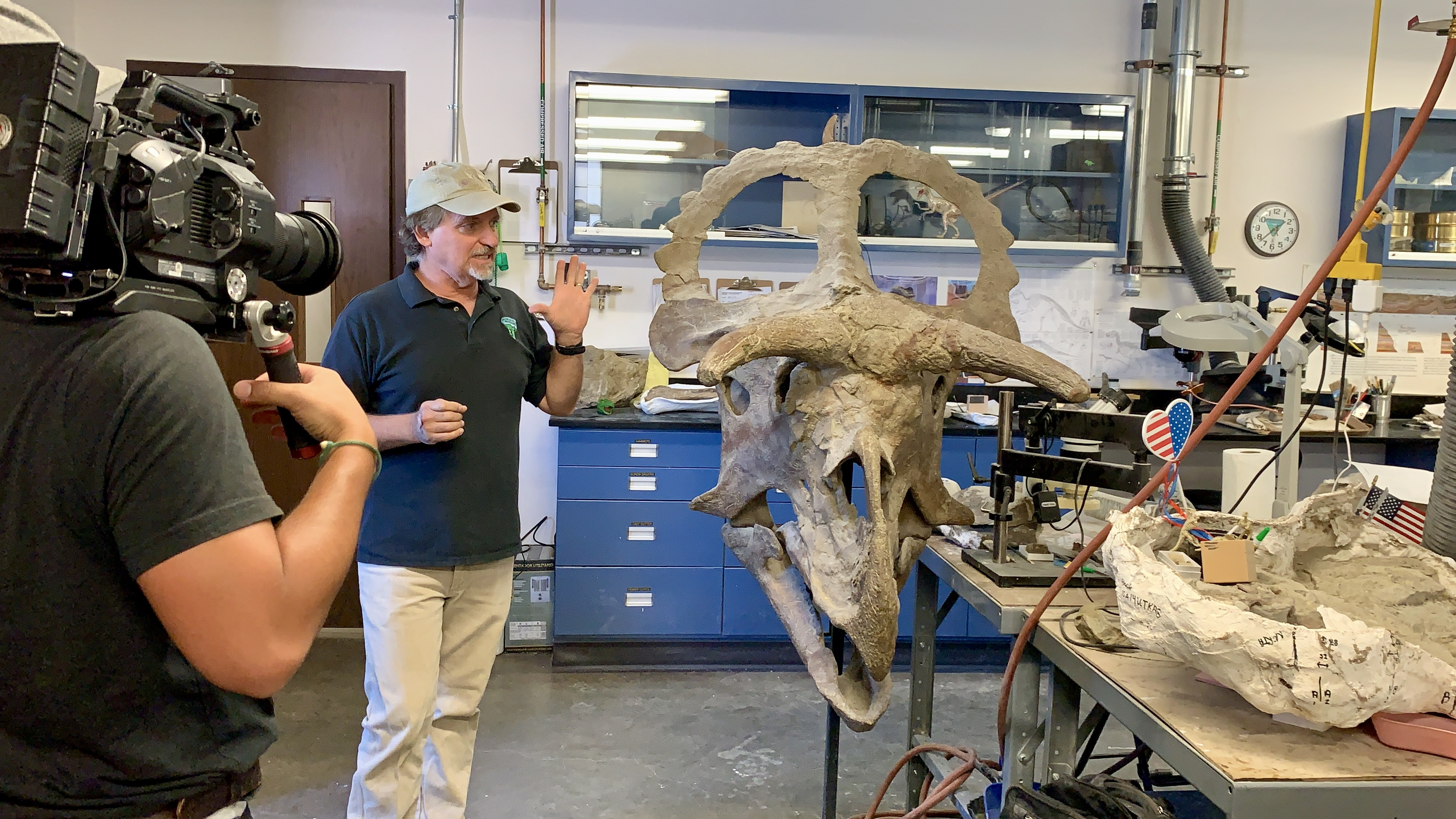
Holotype skull (above) during preparation at the Natural History Museum of Utah in 2009, and Alan L. Titus (below) with the reconstructed skull of his namesake, N. titusi, in 2019

The holotype specimen UMNH VP 16800 consists of a partial, associated, and nearly complete skull that preserves most of the skull roof. The specimen has been interpreted as being a subadult, based on the degree of fusion of skull elements and bone surface texture. It was collected with an articulated and almost complete left forelimb, an associated yet very fragmentary right forelimb (both lacking hand bones), much of the pectoral girdle, an almost complete syncervical vertebra (the three first neck vertebrae fused together), three associated but fragmentary dorsal vertebrae (of the back), as well as three patches of skin impressions associated with the left forelimb (the only ceratopsid skin impressions known from the GSENM and some of the few known worldwide). Two specimens from other quarries were assigned due to shared features with the holotype: specimen UMNH VP 19466, a disarticulated adult skull consisting of the partial right and left premaxillae (which form much of the upper jaw), a right maxilla (tooth-bearing bone of the upper jaw) and right nasal bone (the largest bone at the top of the snout), and specimen UMNH VP 19469, an isolated squamosal bone (which formed part of the side of the parietosquamosal frill at the back of the skull) of a subadult. Taken together, these specimens represent about 80% of the skull and about 10% of the postcranial skeleton.

A spate of ceratopsian discoveries were made in the early 21st century, when many new taxa were named; a 2013 study stated that half of all valid genera were named since 2003, and the decade has been called a "ceratopsid renaissance". Sampson and colleagues stated that understanding of centrosaurine evolution had greatly increased in the years leading up to 2013, with 12 out of 17 known taxa having been described in the prior decade alone. In the UMNH press release accompanying the description of Nasutoceratops, the large nose of the dinosaur was emphasized, with Sampson calling it a "jumbo-sized schnoz". This was reflected in news outlets, with one article titled "paleontologists discover, mock, new dinosaur species", and another including humorous poems about the dinosaur by columnist Alexandra Petri, such as: "Higgledy piggledy, Nasutoceratops, Long-nosed horned just-unearthed dino du jour, Probably used its horns, For showing dominance, During its courtship (although we're not sure)". Nasutoceratops was featured in the 2019 Jurassic World short film Battle at Big Rock and the 2022 feature film Jurassic World Dominion, in what a UMNH article called a "pivotal role". Colin Trevorrow, the director of the former film, called Nasutoceratops "a beautiful herbivore that feels like a Texas Longhorn" (a breed of cattle).

== Description ==
Size (purple, left) compared to a human and other ceratopsids, with centrosaurines on the left and chasmosaurines on the right

The subadult holotype skull of Nasutoceratops is approximately 1.5 m (4.9 ft) long. Nasutoceratops is estimated to have been 4.5 m (14.8 ft) long and to have weighed 1.5 t (1.7 short tons). As a centrosaurine ceratopsid, it would have been a large bodied, quadrupedal dinosaur with a huge skull, a hooked upper beak, a heavily constructed skeleton, a shortened, down-swept tail, a large pelvis indicating powerful muscles, and short digits. Nasutoceratops had three horns; the nasal horn above the nasal opening and the brow horns above the eye sockets. As is general for ceratopsians, it had epiossifications (accessory ossifications) on the margins of the neck frill (episquamosals and epiparietals) and on the cheeks (epijugals). Their external texture was very vascularized and rugose, and they were most likely covered by a keratinous sheath when the dinosaur was alive.

=== Skull ===
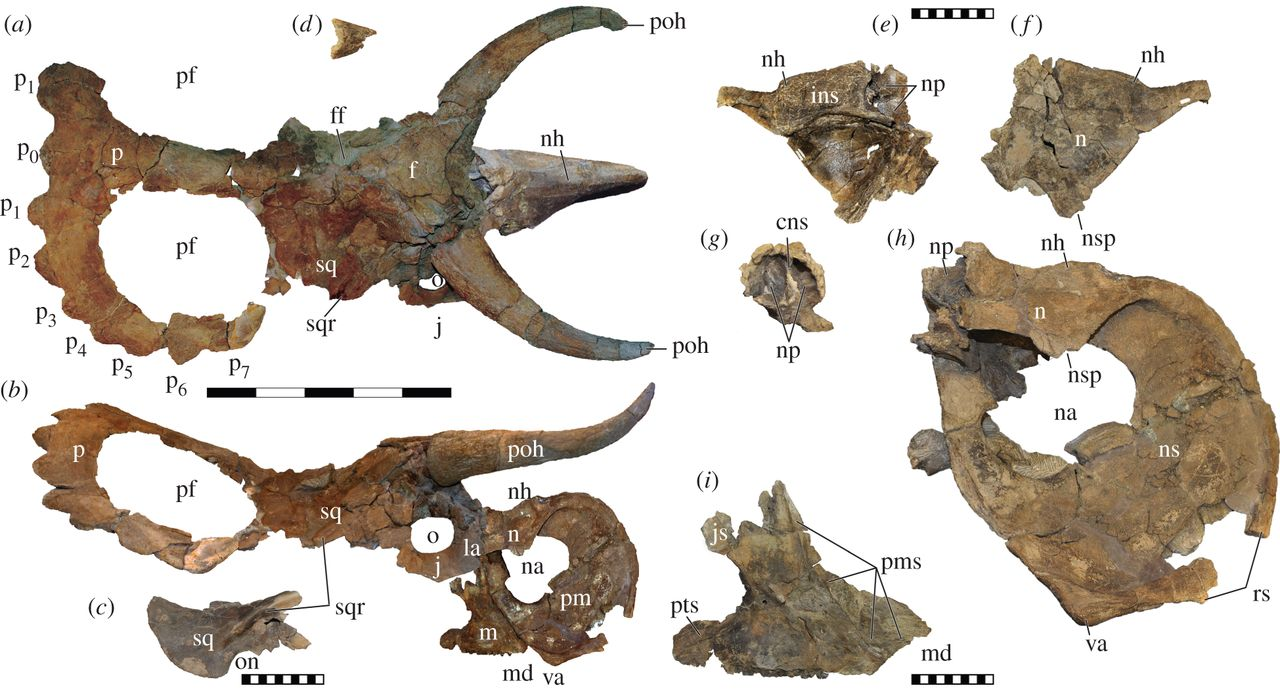
Known skull material of the holotype, with squamosal bone (c) and nasal bone (e-f) of two assigned specimens

The front part of the skull of Nasutoceratops is unusually deep from top to bottom, especially around the nostril area, similar to that of Diabloceratops. The external nostril forms 75% of the skull length in front of the eye sockets, more than in other ceratopsians. The snout region is almost circular overall, which is typical of centrosaurines, but it differs from more derived (or "advanced") centrosaurines and is more similar to the basal (early diverging) Diabloceratops in that it expands upwards, giving the snout region a bulbous appearance. The shortness of the snout is a result of the abbreviated nasal and maxilla bones, and it may be the shortest of any centrosaurine. The rostral (a bone unique to ceratopsians, which forms the upper beak and contacts the front part of the premaxilla) is not preserved in Nasutoceratops, but by inferring from the contact area of the premaxilla behind it, it has been interpreted as triangular in side view, similar to centrosaurines and unlike chasmosaurines (the other main group of ceratopsids). The deep, thin, and rounded septum at the front of the premaxilla appears to be more extensive than in any other ceratopsid, and extends hindwards to underlie the horn core of the nasal.

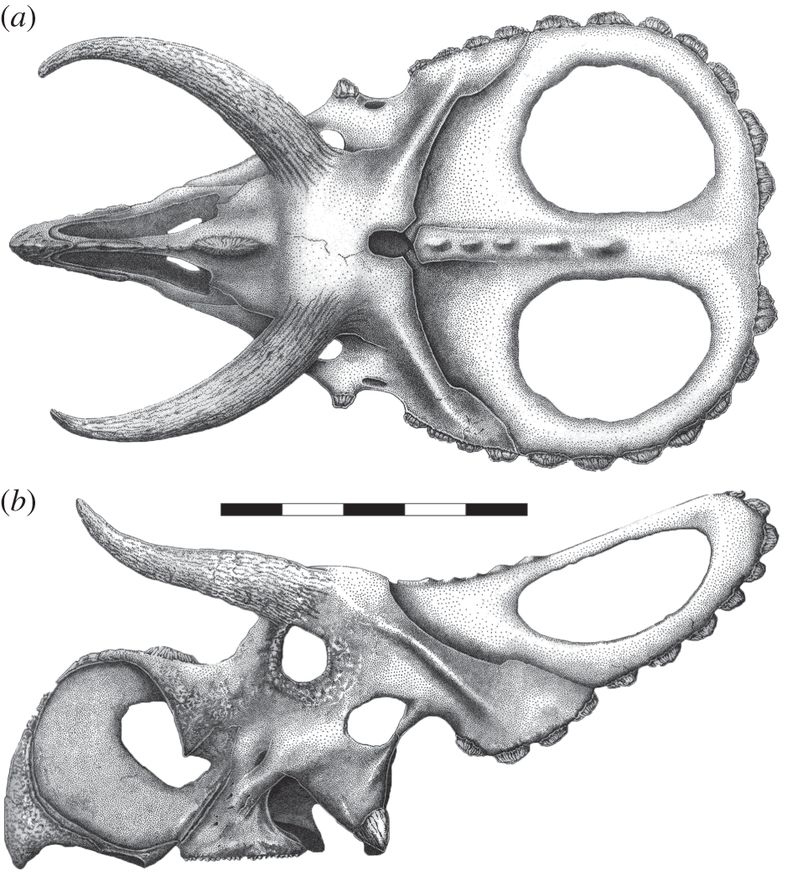
Reconstructed skull diagram showing the upper and left sides

A short hard palate is present on the premaxilla, a feature otherwise only seen in Pachyrhinosaurus among centrosaurines. Nasutoceratops differs from other ceratopsids in that the dorsal ascending ramus (upwards directed portion of bone) of the maxilla has a thin-walled contact surface for the hindwards projecting process of the premaxilla. The contact surface of the maxilla for the premaxilla is very expanded (forming a contact shelf), and has a deeply excavated sulcus (groove), unlike in other ceratopsids. Each maxilla is estimated to have contained 29 teeth, but it has not been determined whether they were double-rooted as in other ceratopsids or single-rooted as in neoceratopsians. The maxillary teeth have nearly vertical wear facets on their inwards surfaces, as is typical of ceratopsids. The tooth row is displaced downward in relation to the front part of the maxilla where it contacts the premaxilla, unlike in most ceratopsids, but similar to Diabloceratops, Avaceratops, and more basal neoceratopsians. The maxillary flange at the front of the maxilla, which contributes to the hard palate by slotting into the premaxilla, is double-socketed, a unique feature of Nasutoceratops. The back of the maxilla has a somewhat well-developed excavation on the side towards the "cheek", which seems to be less defined than in other ceratopsids.

The fused nasal bones of Nasutoceratops (which form the upper hind part of the snout) are relatively short from front to back compared to more derived centrosaurines. The nasal horn core that formed the bony part of the horn above the nasal opening is low, long, and blade-like, pinched from side to side along the hind part, and with a somewhat raised, teardrop-shaped expansion at the front. The horn's texture is rugose and vascularized, as is typical for ceratopsids. The nasal bones flare out to the sides in front of the horn, forming a "roof" in front of much of the nasal cavity, similar to Centrosaurus and Achelousaurus. There is a spine formed by the nasal and premaxilla, as is typical in centrosaurines, which extends into the nasal cavity and results in an hour glass shape when the cavity is viewed from the front. Seen from the side, the inner nasal opening is relatively small and slightly crescent-shaped, with an upwards arched front border. The longest axis of the internal nostril opening is almost horizontally oriented, whereas it is almost vertical in most other centrosaurines. The nasal bones have well-developed internal cavities behind the horn, which suggests they were hollow, and possibly pneumatized (air-filled); pneumatic nasals are unknown in other ceratopsians.

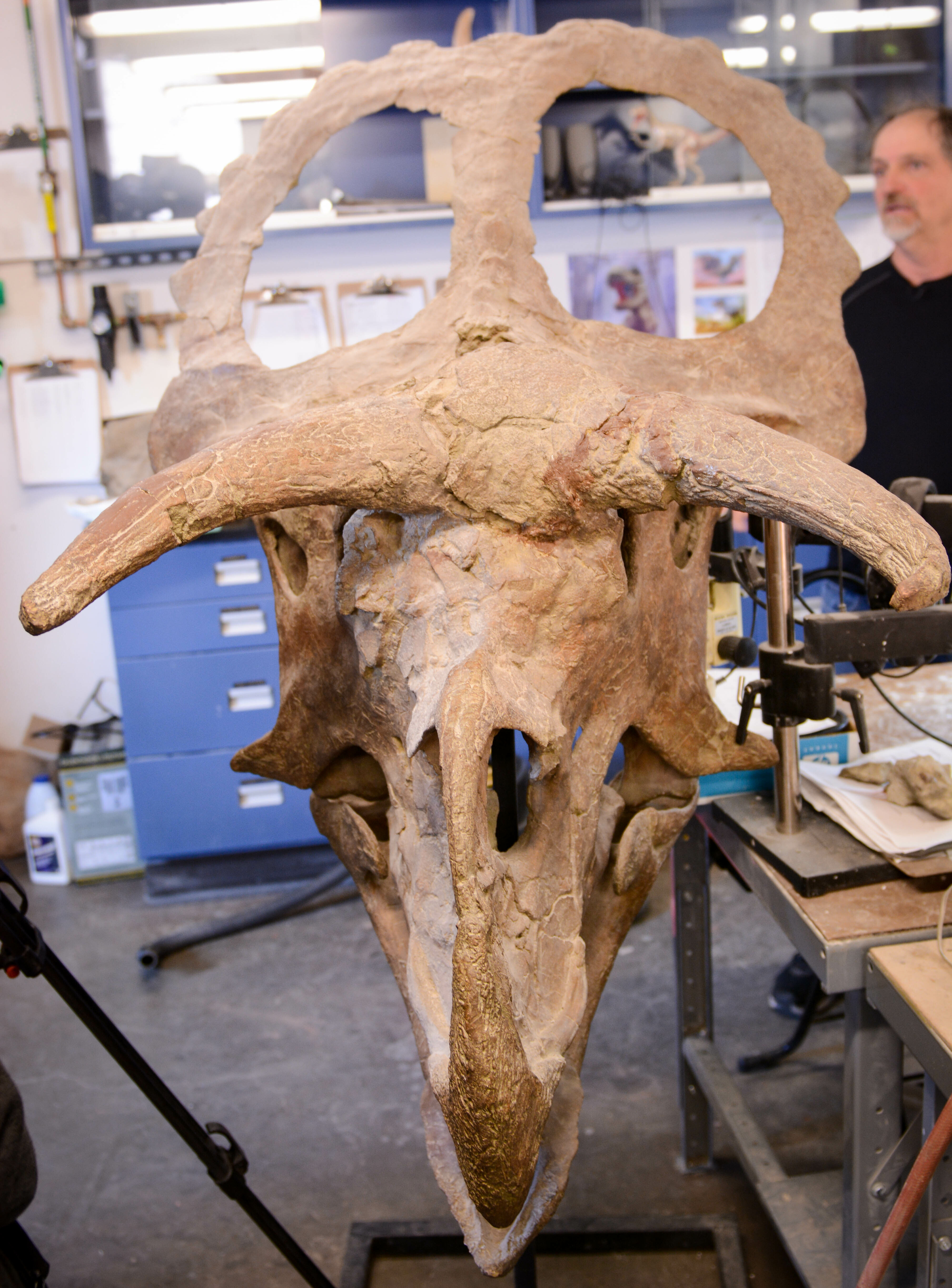
Reconstructed skull, UMNH

The brow horns of Nasutoceratops are one of its most notable features; the supraorbital horn cores of ceratopsids were outgrowths of the postorbital bone with slight contribution from the palpebral bone above and in front of the eye sockets, but those of Nasutoceratops differ in orientation and (to a lesser degree) shape. The brow horns of Nasutoceratops are strongly curved; their bases are pointed forward and outwards, then curve inwards, and ultimately twist their points upwards. The horns are very elongated and span approximately 40% of total skull length, almost reaching the level of the snout tip. This horn configuration has been described as superficially similar to that of a Texas Longhorn bull. With a bone core length of up to 457 mm (18.0 in) in the holotype, the brow horns of Nasutoceratops are the longest known of any centrosaurine, both in absolute and relative terms. The majority of other centrosaurines had relatively short brow horns, with elongated horns only being present in basal forms like Diabloceratops, Avaceratops, and Albertaceratops. The brow horns of Nasutoceratops also differ from those of other ceratopsids by mainly pointing up and away from the eyes, without torsion.

The postorbital bone forms most of the upper skull roof, and most of the upper margin of the eye socket, which was elliptical, as is typical for ceratopsids. The skull roof is very vaulted around the eye region, which gives the impression that Nasutoceratops had a forward facing "forehead" across its width, similar to Diabloceratops and Albertaceratops, as well as many chasmosaurines. The epijugal bone (or cheek horn) is roughly trihedral in shape (with three plane faces meeting at the same point) and that of the holotype is 85 mm (3.3 in) long and 78 mm (3.1 in) wide at the base, the largest known among centrosaurines. Large epijugals are more typical for chasmosaurines, but are also found in Diabloceratops.

The parietosquamosal neck frill at the back of the skull was formed by the fused parietal bones and paired squamosal bones, as in all other ceratopsids. The frill is almost circular with its widest point at the middle region. The total length of the frill of the holotype is around 610 mm (24 in), almost equal to the length of the basal skull (from premaxilla to the occipital condyle at the back of the skull, excluding the frill), with a width around 800 mm (31 in). While the frill is similar to those of Centrosaurus, Achelousaurus, and Einiosaurus in overall shape, it greatly differs from them in the organization of the episquamosals and epiparietals. The frill has two large, oval parietal fenestrae, one on each parietal, as is typical for centrosaurines. The longest axis of each fenestra (from front to back) is about 350 mm (14 in) long, accounting for about 57% of the frills length, and the width from side to side is 260 mm (10 in), accounting for about 33% of the frill's width. The frill is saddle-shaped, with the upper surface being convex from side to side and concave from front to back, as typical for centrosaurines. The squamosal bone is similar to those of other centrosaurines, and forms about a third of the frill. The squamosal has a high ridge on its outer surface, running from the direction of the eye socket towards the squamosal rim, which is unusual for centrosaurines, but is present in taxa like Avaceratops. The presence of four or five undulations on the margin of the squamosal suggests that episquamosals were attached to these, and their shape was probably similar to the epiparietals on the rest of the frill, which are relatively uniform.

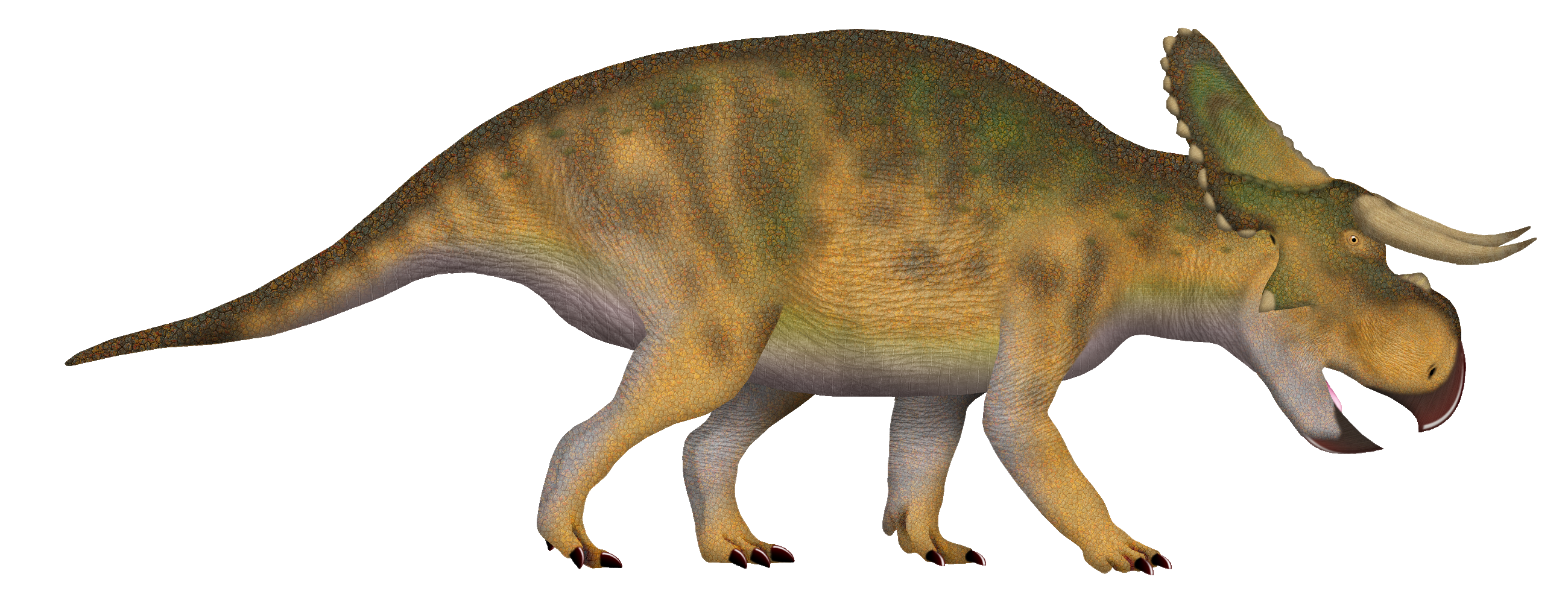
Hypothetical life restoration

The fused parietal bones form about two-thirds of the frill, and unlike the squamosal which is usually conservative across centrosaurines, these bones are mostly unique to a species and used for determining interrelationships. On each side of the frill, one parietal has seven undulations on the margin, as well as an undulation on the midline at the top of the frill; these would have been capped by epiparietals. Midline epiparietals are otherwise only known in chasmosaurines, and another contrast with other centrosaurines is that the frill is rounded at the back of the midline, with no indentation there. The median bar between the fenestrae is thin near the margins but thick at the midline, and is strap-like overall. The upper side of the median bar is convex at the front, and forms a low, rounded ridge with five undulations of varying height along the midline. The median bar widens toward the top of the frill, where it widens into the also broad and strap-like transverse parietal bar. The forward projected ramus on the side of the parietal rounds out the frill and encloses the fenestrae; the ramus is thickest near the side edges where the marginal undulations and epiparietals are located, and thinnest towards the fenestrae. The epiparietals are low, roughly crescent-shaped, and asymmetrical, and their lower surface is slightly concave. They project outward on the same plane as the underlying part of the parietal, with some downward flexion. They are of almost the same size along the hind and side margins of the frill, but are slightly smaller towards the front. The frill lacked the well-developed hooks and spikes that are otherwise typical for centrosaurines. Since the holotype was not fully grown, it is possible such hooks would have developed as it matured, but this is considered unlikely due to the fusion of its epiparietals on the frill and fusion of other bones related to maturity.

=== Postcranial skeleton ===
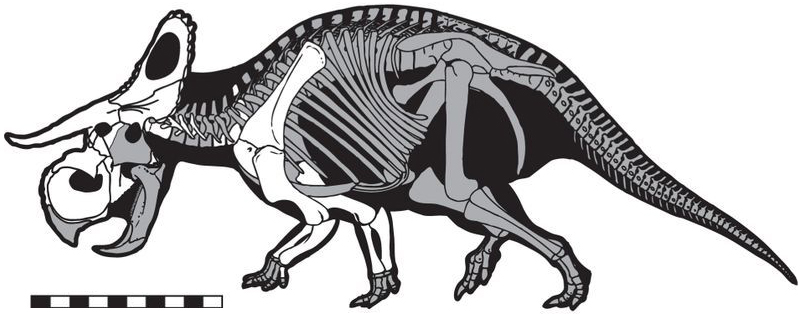
Skeletal diagram showing known remains in white

Ceratopsids are mainly distinguished through features pertaining to their skull roofs, and the postcranial skeleton of Nasutoceratops is typical of the group. The three frontmost neck vertebrae of ceratopsids were fused into a syncervical vertebra, and that of Nasutoceratops is particularly similar to that of Styracosaurus. At the front, it has the characteristic deep socket that received the occipital condyle at the back of the skull. The dorsal vertebrae are also typical for ceratopsids, with their centra (or "bodies") being short from front to back and their neural arches (the upper part of the vertebrae) being very tall. The articular facets of the centra are almost circular to pear-shaped, similar to those of Styracosaurus. The transverse processes at the sides of these vertebrae are elevated and have prominent zygapophyses (the processes of the vertebrae that articulated with the prezygapophyses of a following vertebrae), typical for the group.

The scapula (shoulder blade) is long and relatively slender, its hind part is flattened and flared, and is similar to those of other centrosaurines overall. The coracoid (part of the shoulder-girdle) is fused to the front end of the scapula, as is often the case in ceratopsids, and has a large foramen (opening) at the front. The humerus (upper arm bone) is 475 mm (18.7 in) long, and has a hemispheric humeral head (upper part) and prominent deltopectoral crest, which accounts for of almost half the whole length of the humerus, as common for the group. The humerus is long and slender, but otherwise typical. The ulna (one of two lower arm bones) is 400 mm (16 in) long and has a large olecranon process where the triceps muscle inserted. The radius (the other lower arm bone) is thin with expanded ends, a general feature of ceratopsids.

=== Skin impressions ===
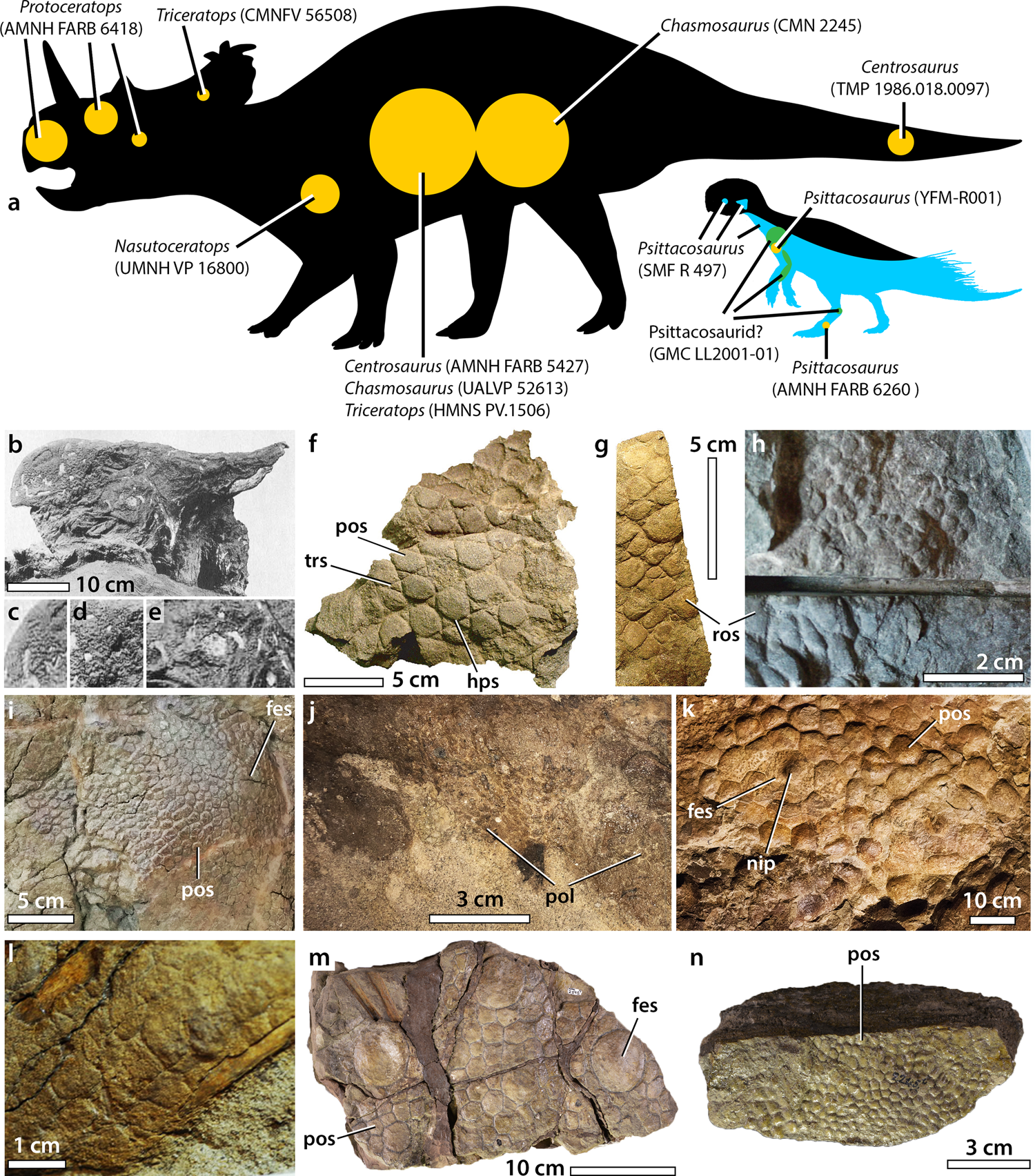
Skin impressions of various ceratopsians with silhouettes showing their locations; f, g, and h are from the left forelimb of Nasutoceratops

The three patches with skin impressions that are associated with the scapula and humerus of the left forelimb of the holotype are preserved both as casts and molds, and show three kinds of patterns formed by tubercle (round nodule) shaped scales. The patches are identified as patch A, B, and C, and cover 120 cm^{2} (19 sq in), 84 cm^{2} (13.0 sq in), and 25 cm^{2} (3.9 sq in), respectively. Patch A consists of tightly packed, oval to almost circular tubercles which vary from 2–8 mm (0.079–0.315 in) in diameter, and are arranged in irregular rows. Patch B consists of larger, loosely packed almost circular tubercles, varying from 5–11 mm (0.20–0.43 in) in diameter, also arranged in irregular rows. Patch C, the most notable impression, consists of raised, hexagonal tubercles that measure 8–11 mm (0.31–0.43 in) in diameter, and are surrounded by triangular grooves. This patch is located between patch A and B.

Patches A and B have variably sized scales that are round to elliptical and are arranged in irregular rows, similar to what is known from other ceratopsians (including Psittacosaurus, Chasmosaurus, and Centrosaurus). Patch C differs in that it is composed of hexagonal tubercles that are relatively equal in size. These tubercles are separated from the surrounding tubercles by triangular creases and patterns that are unusual among ceratopsians. Similar hexagram-like patterns were later observed on the limbs of Psittacosaurus, and have been called "stars". There is also no evidence in Nasutoceratops of single circular scales much larger than the scales surrounding them, as seen in Chasmosaurus and Centrosaurus.

== Classification ==
Nasutoceratops was assigned to Centrosaurinae by Sampson and colleagues in 2013 based on features such as the premaxilla having a pronounced downward angle, the almost circular narial (bony nostril) region, having a spine composed of the nasal and premaxilla, and in having an abbreviated squamosal with a stepped hind margin. But despite dating to the late Campanian age of the Late Cretaceous, and being contemporary with the derived northern centrosaurines Styracosaurus and Centrosaurus, Nasutoceratops retained more "primitive" features, such as the maxillary tooth row being displaced downward, elongated brow horns, and pronounced epijugals, which were absent in other centrosaurines of the time. The phylogenetic analysis of the study found Nasutoceratops to be the sister taxon of Avaceratops from the Judith River Formation of Montana, the two forming a previously unknown clade near the base of Centrosaurinae. They shared features such as simplified frills without prominent epiparietal ornamentation, and an undulation of the frill's midline instead of an indentation.

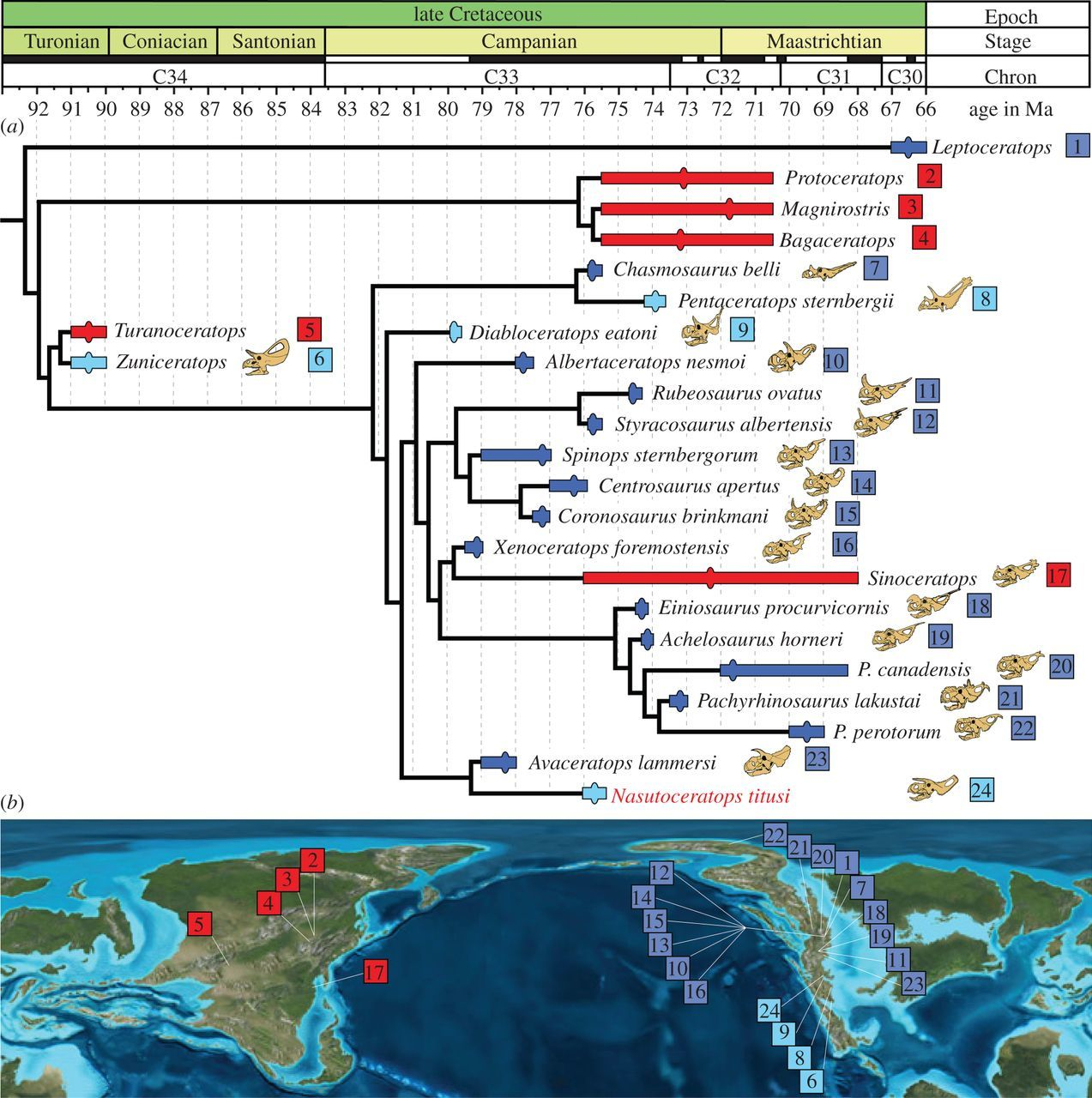
Time-calibrated phylogenetic relationships of Ceratopsidae (above), and paleogeographic map of the Late Cretaceous with distribution of ceratopsids (below), following Sampson and colleagues, 2013. Nasutoceratops is 24.

Sampson and colleagues stated that the current knowledge indicated that centrosaurines originated on Laramidia (an island continent consisting of what is now western North America) 90–80 million years ago, and that this group split near the base, with most known centrosaurines in one clade from north Laramidia that evolved towards having abbreviated or absent brow horns and more elaborate frills, and Nasutoceratops and Avaceratops in the other, which de-emphasized their frill ornamentation in favor of enlarged brow horns. The late Campanian Nasutoceratops lived about 2 million years later than the early Campanian Avaceratops, and their clade existed in both northern and southern Laramidia. In their 2016 follow-up article, Lund and colleagues stated that the discovery of Nasutoceratops clarified overall patterns in centrosaurine evolution, and conducted a Bayesian analysis of ceratopsians, the first for the group, which agreed with the results of the 2013 analysis.

In 2016, the paleontologist Héctor E. Rivera-Sylva and colleagues reported a partial centrosaurine skeleton (specimen CPC 274) from the Aguja Formation of Coahuila, Mexico, which grouped with Avaceratops and Nasutoceratops in their phylogenetic analysis. The following year, the paleontologist Michael J. Ryan and colleagues reported a centrosaurine skull (specimen CMN 8804) from the Oldman Formation of Alberta, Canada, which they also found to group with Nasutoceratops and Avaceratops. These authors named this new clade Nasutoceratopsini, with Nasutoceratops as the type genus; this group was defined as all centrosaurines more closely related to Nasutoceratops than to Centrosaurus, containing Nasutoceratops, Avaceratops, MOR 692 (previously treated as an adult Avaceratops), CMN 8804, and another undescribed ceratopsian (specimen GPDM 63) from Malta, Montana. They noted that while new family groups are traditionally named after the first named genus within it, Avaceratops being the first named member, the type specimen of that taxon is juvenile, which makes identification of distinct features problematic, whereas Nasutoceratops has several distinct adult features. In 2017, the specimen from Mexico was named Yehuecauhceratops by Rivera-Sylva and colleagues, and formally assigned to Nasutoceratopsini.

The paleontologist Sebastian G. Dalman and colleagues named Crittendenceratops in 2018 based on two partial specimens from the Fort Crittenden Formation of Arizona, and assigned the genus to Nasutoceratopsini. These authors found Yehuecauhceratops to be the sister taxon of Nasutoceratops within the group. The 2021 phylogenetic analysis by Dalman and colleagues accompanying the description of the basal centrosaurine Menefeeceratops from the Menefee Formation of New Mexico did not result in Nasutoceratopsini forming a monophyletic (natural) group; all members were found to be basal centrosaurines, forming a polytomy, or unresolved group. They cautioned that more material, especially parietal bones, was needed to determine the position of potential nasutoceratopsins near the base of Centrosaurinae, as well as the potential membership of Menefeeceratops to the group. The paleontologist Hiroki Ishikawa and colleagues did recover Nasutoceratopsini as a natural, basal group in their 2023 analysis, and found the new genus Furcatoceratops from the Judith River Formation to be close to Nasutoceratops. They did not include Yehuecauhceratops, Crittendenceratops, and Menefeeceratops in their analysis due to their fragmentary nature, and considered the presence of a well-developed squamosal ridge a synapomorphy (shared derived feature) of Nasutoceratopsini.

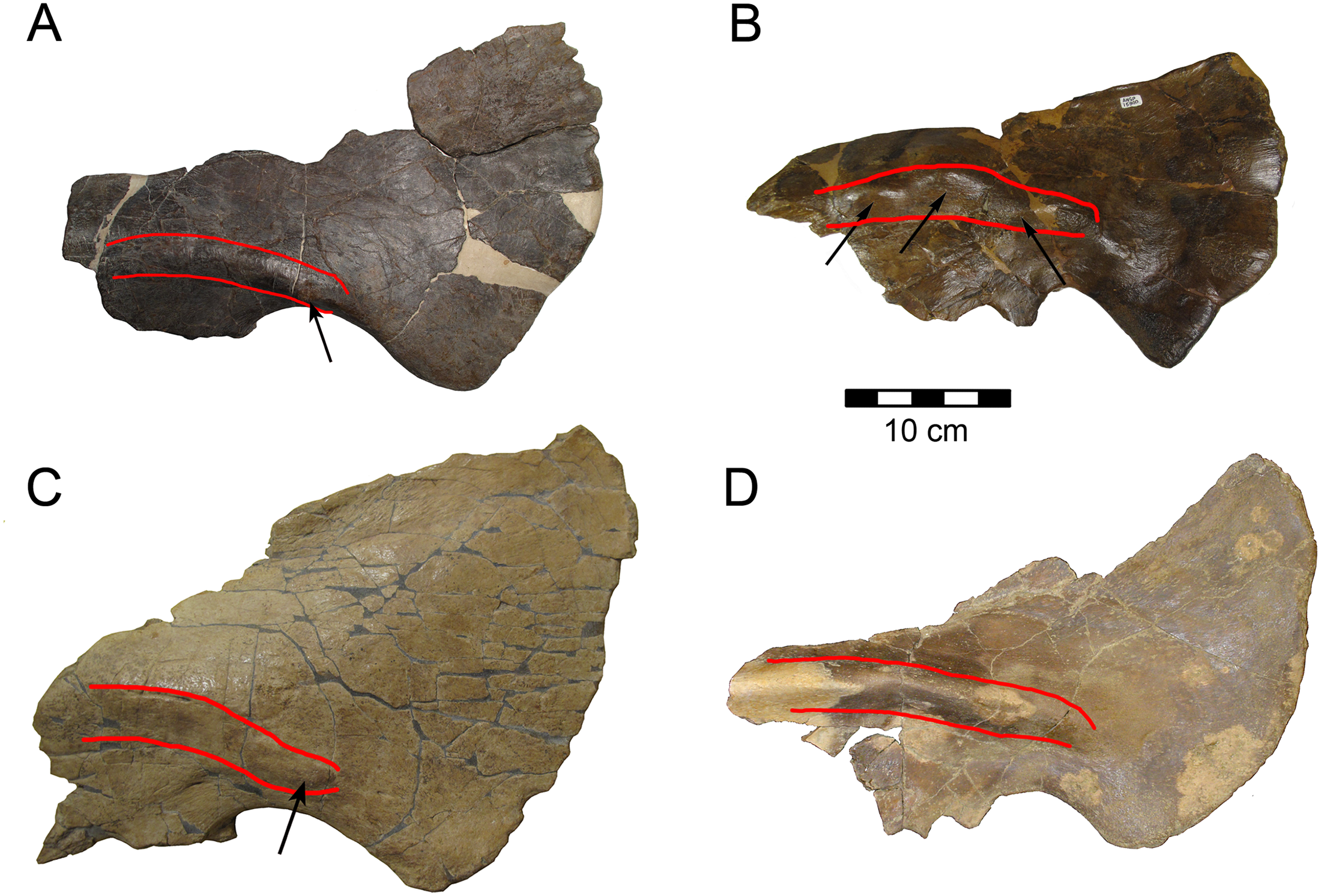
Comparison between the squamosal bones of Yehuecauhceratops (A), Avaceratops (B), Menefeeceratops, and Nasutoceratops (D), with red lines indicating their raised ridge

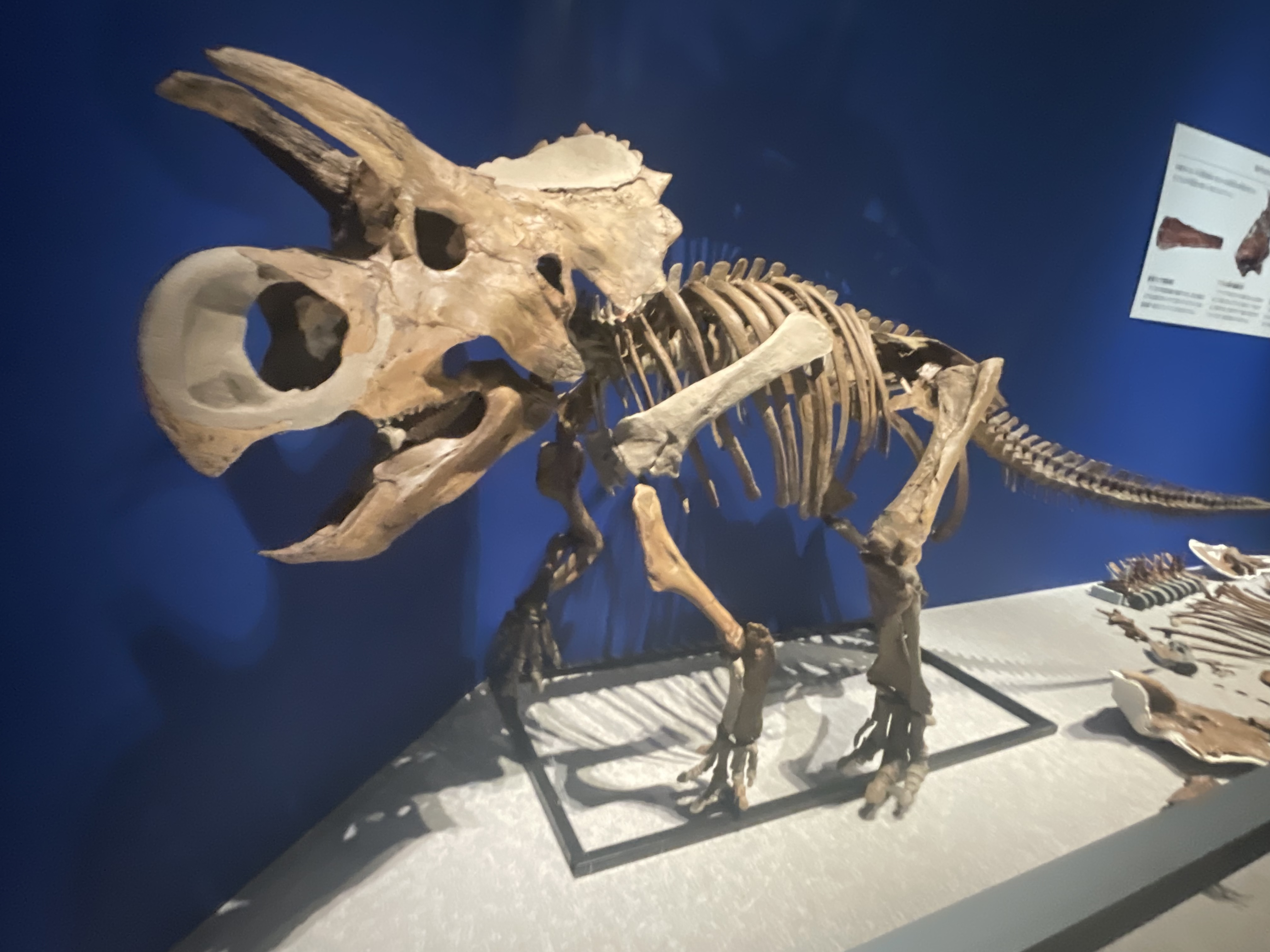
Reconstructed skeleton of the related Furcatoceratops from the Judith River Formation

The cladogram below follows the 2023 phylogenetic analysis by Ishikawa and colleagues, and shows the position of Nasutoceratops within Ceratopsidae:

- Ceratopsidae
  - Chasmosaurinae
    - Chasmosaurus belli
    - Pentaceratops sternbergii
  - Centrosaurinae
    - Diabloceratops eatoni
    - Machairoceratops cronusi
    - - Nasutoceratopsini
        - Avaceratops lammersi
        - CMN 8804
        - MOR 692 (cf. Avaceratops)
        - Nasutoceratops titusi
        - Furcatoceratops elucidans
      - Xenoceratops foremostensis
      - Albertaceratops nesmoi
      - Medusaceratops lokii
      - Wendiceratops pinhornensis
      - Sinoceratops zhuchengensis
      - Eucentrosaura

=== Paleobiogeography ===
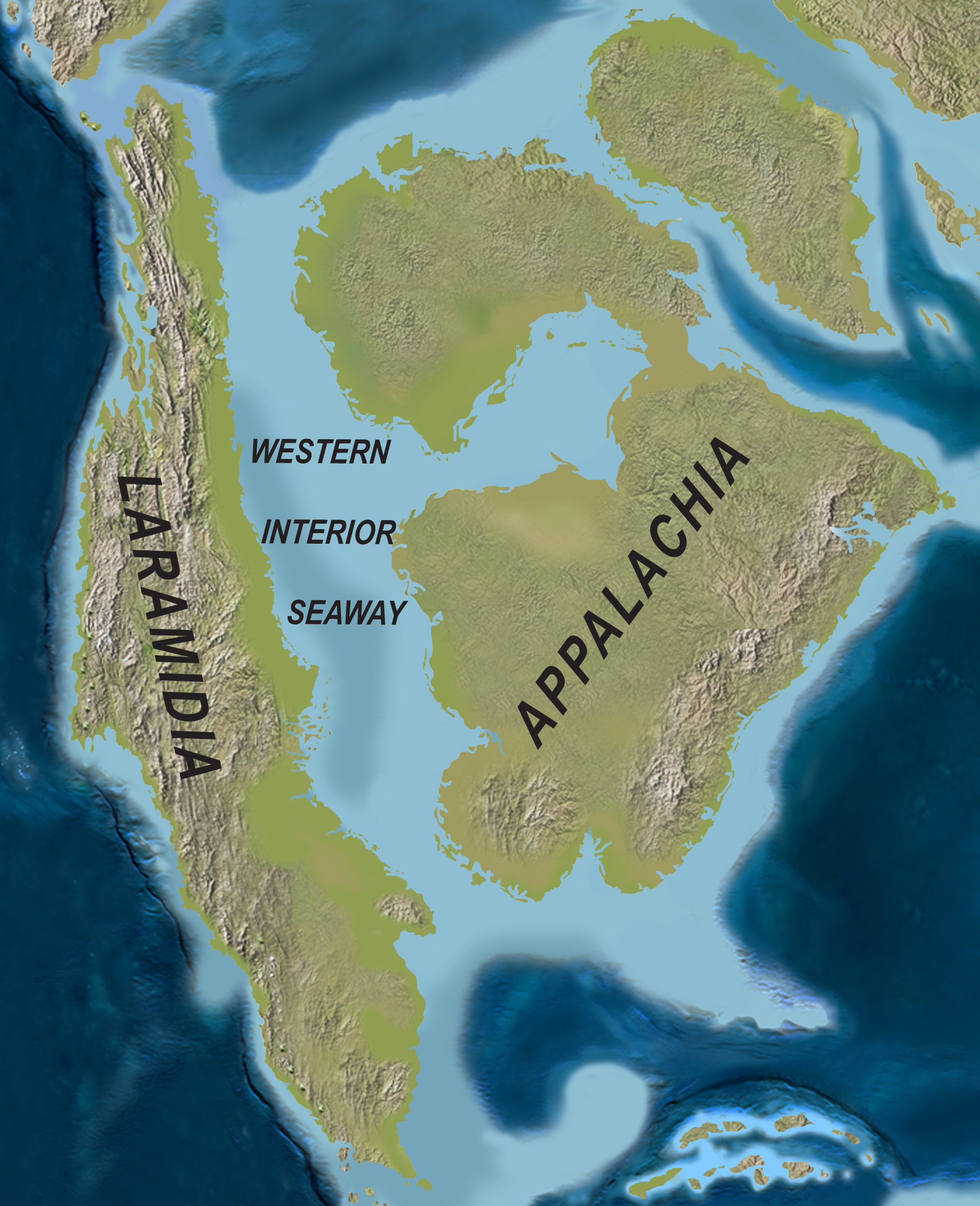
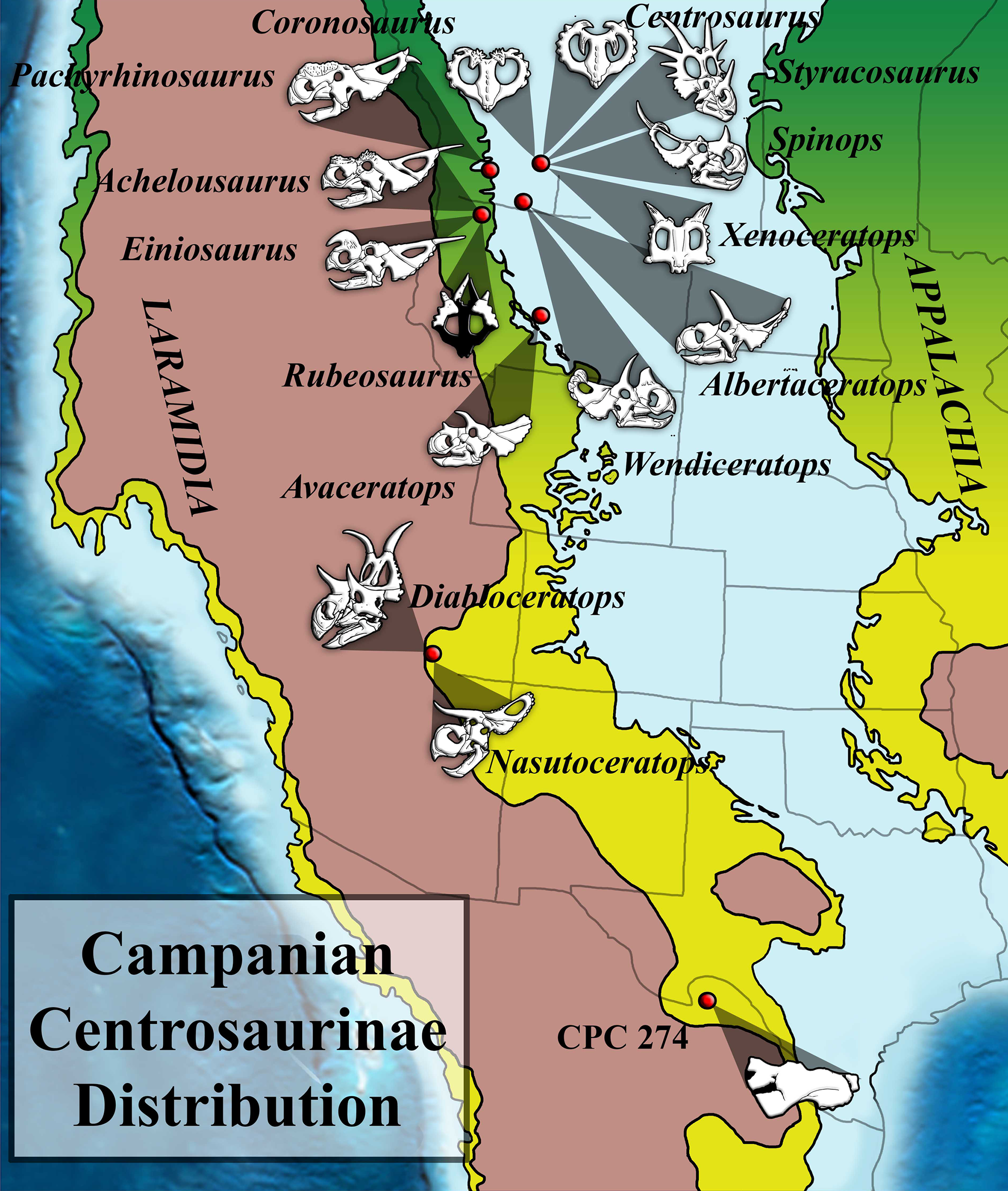
Paleomap of North America during the Campanian age (left), and paleobiogeography of contemporary centrosaurines known by 2016 (right); Nasutoceratops lived in southern Laramidia

Sampson and colleagues stated in 2013 that the discovery of Nasutoceratops provided support for the "dinosaur provincialism hypothesis", which postulates that there was separation between the fauna of northern and southern Laramidia for more than a million years during the late Campanian, with at least two coeval dinosaur communities. They pointed out that though the northern Avaceratops was the sister taxon of Nasutoceratops, it was several million years older, and by the time of Nasutoceratops, this genus was distinct from the northern centrosaurines, which belonged to another clade. Samspon and colleagues concluded that ceratopsids went through a rapid evolutionary turnover during the Campanian, and became the most diverse dinosaur clade in Laramidia. No centrosaurines known from northern Laramidia have been found in the south, and centrosaurines underwent substantial diversification in southern Laramidia early in the Campanian.

In 2016, Lund and colleagues also found that the presence of a northern centrosaurine clade with short brow horns and a southern clade with long brow horns that were separated geographically for a million years supported the idea of dinosaur provinciality. They pointed out that particularly the time overlap between Styracosaurus in the north and Nasutoceratops in the south shows that these provinces were evolutionary centers for endemism. They also noted that, apart from Nasutoceratops, all centrosaurines with elongated brow horns were of much older age, and since the derived northern forms with short brow horns probably descended from long-horned forms, both the northern and southern branches may have originated independently from basal, long-horned centrosaurines. Following this scenario, centrosaurines would have originated in the south 80 million years ago (as indicated by basal forms like Diabloceratops from Utah) and dispersed to the north 79 million years ago (as indicated by Xenoceratops from Alberta), and the Avaceratops-Nasutoceratops clade was present in both north and south by 78.5–78 million years ago. Then speciation occurred after the northern and southern centrosaurines became isolated from each other, while Avaceratops went extinct in the north, but Nasutoceratops persisted in the south.

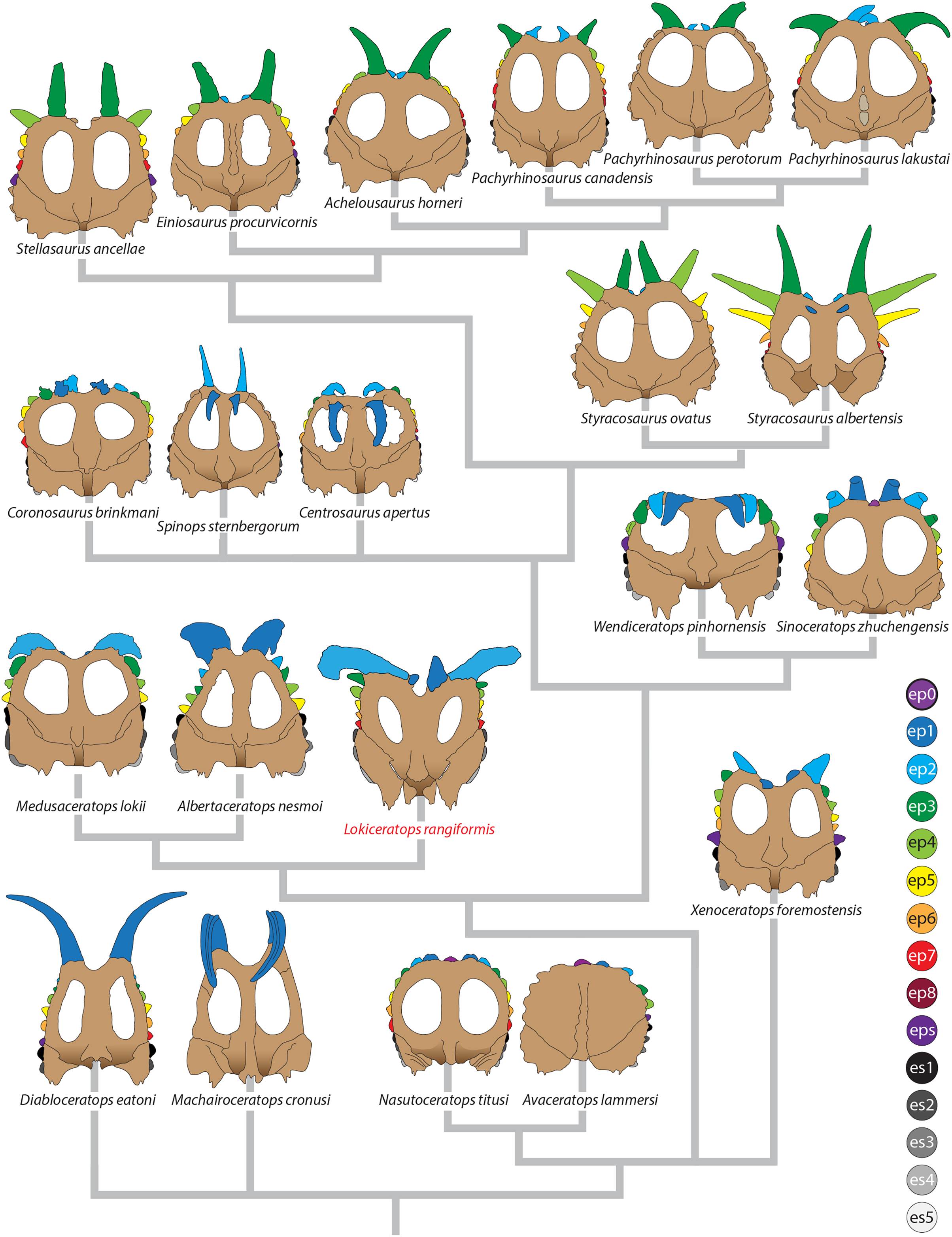
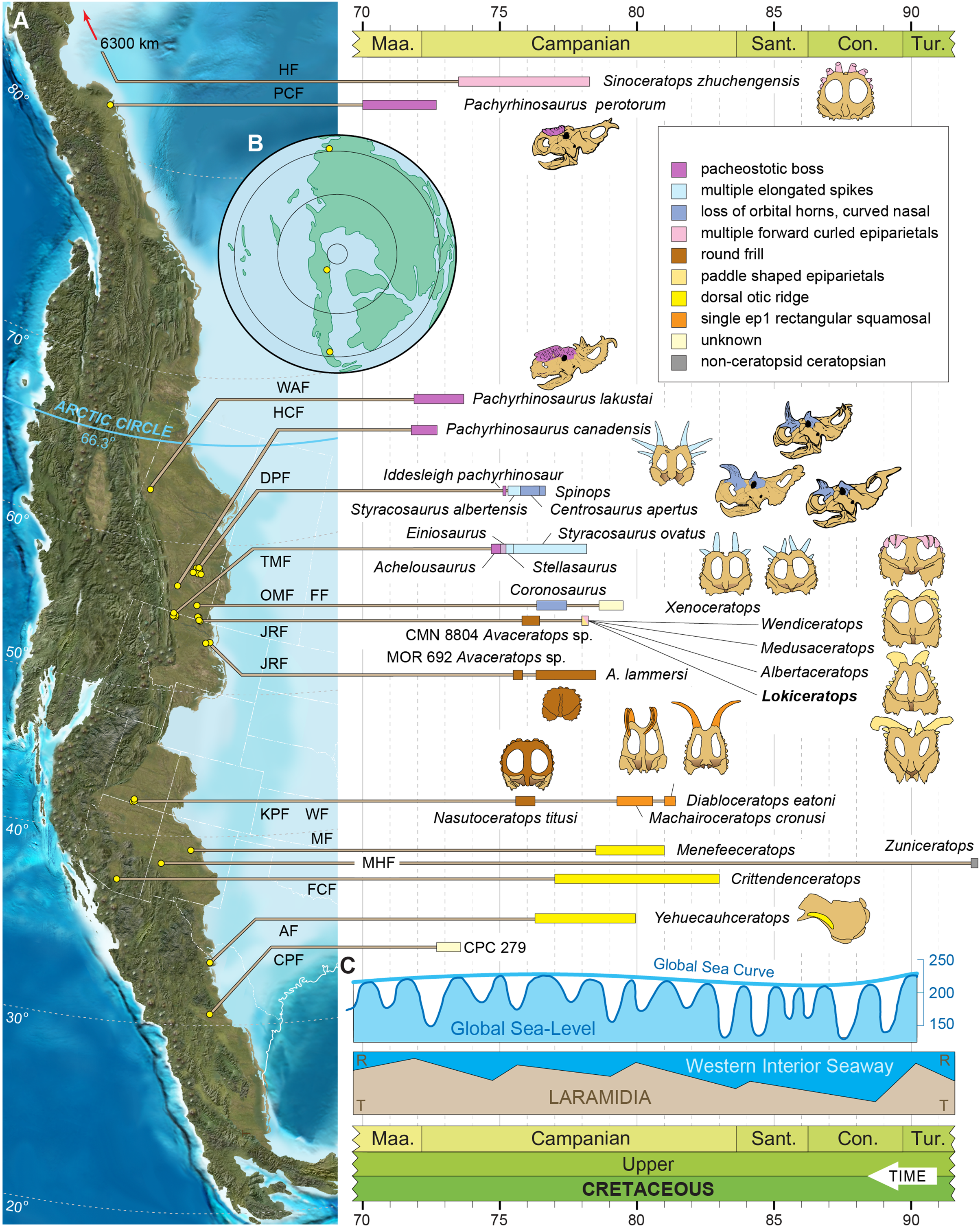
Comparison between centrosaurine neck frills known by 2024 (left) and map showing their paleogeographic and stratigraphic distribution

Ryan and colleagues stated in 2017 that the nasutoceratopsin specimen CMN 8804 from Alberta showed that the group persisted in both northern and southern Laramidia, and that their geographically and temporally large distribution weakened the idea that there would have been distinct provinciality between northern and southern Laramidia. These researchers found that nasutoceratopsins overlapped briefly in time with the other two main clades of Centrosaurinae (Centrosaurini and Pachyrhinosaurini), and that centrosaurines were loosely latitudinally distributed during the Late Cretaceous. While nasutoceratopsins occurred in both southern and northern Laramidia, centrosaurins dominated the lower northern Laramidian regions, and pachyrhinosaurins occurred only in the north. They suggested that nasutoceratopsin fossils are rare in the well-sampled Laramidian sediments because they may have had other ecological preferences or social behavior than the contemporary ceratosaurines of the clade Centrosaurini, which are often found in extensive bonebeds in northern Laramidia, or that their fragmentary remains may have been mistaken for members of Centrosaurini.

In 2018, Dalman and colleagues found the specimen that was later named Menefeeceratops to be the oldest centrosaurine from North America, and to have been basal to both nasutoceratopsins and centrosaurins. While not a nasutoceratopsin itself, it shared features with them that suggests this group originated in southern Laramidia. They also pointed out that Crittendenceratops from Arizona, the so far youngest nasutoceratopsin, bridged the evolutionary gap between the slightly older Yehuecauhceratops and the nasutoceratopsins from the late Campanian of northwestern North America. They stated that the distribution of Nasutoceratopsini in time and space further weakened the hypothesis that there would have been distinct northern and southern Laramidian provinces. In 2021, when naming Menefeeceratops, Dalman and colleagues found this genus and other basal centrosaurines (including members of Nasutoceratopsini, which they did not recognize as a distinct group by then) to have lived at the same time as the rather quickly evolving, derived centrosaurines. They concluded that the fossil evidence indicates that Centrosaurinae originated in southern Laramidia and dispersed north during the late Campanian.

In 2024, Loewen and colleagues discussed the high endemism and seemingly restricted distribution of centrosaurid species and why this was the case. They used Nasutoceratops as an example of a centrosaurine not documented from other stratigraphic units outside where it was originally found, and pointed out that while it may have been wide-ranging across southern Laramidia, no non-marine of the same age have been found elsewhere, and the preserved ranges therefore underestimate the true ranges. They also found that the Nasutoceratopsini (including Nasutoceratops and Avaceratops) have a known geographic range distance of 2,000 km (1,200 mi) and a range area of ca 200,000 km^{2} (77,000 sq mi), and along with similar patterns seen in other centrosaurines, they suggested these animals had a high level of endemism, where lineages evolved in isolation and then regional diversification that produced multiple species in the same areas.

== Paleobiology ==
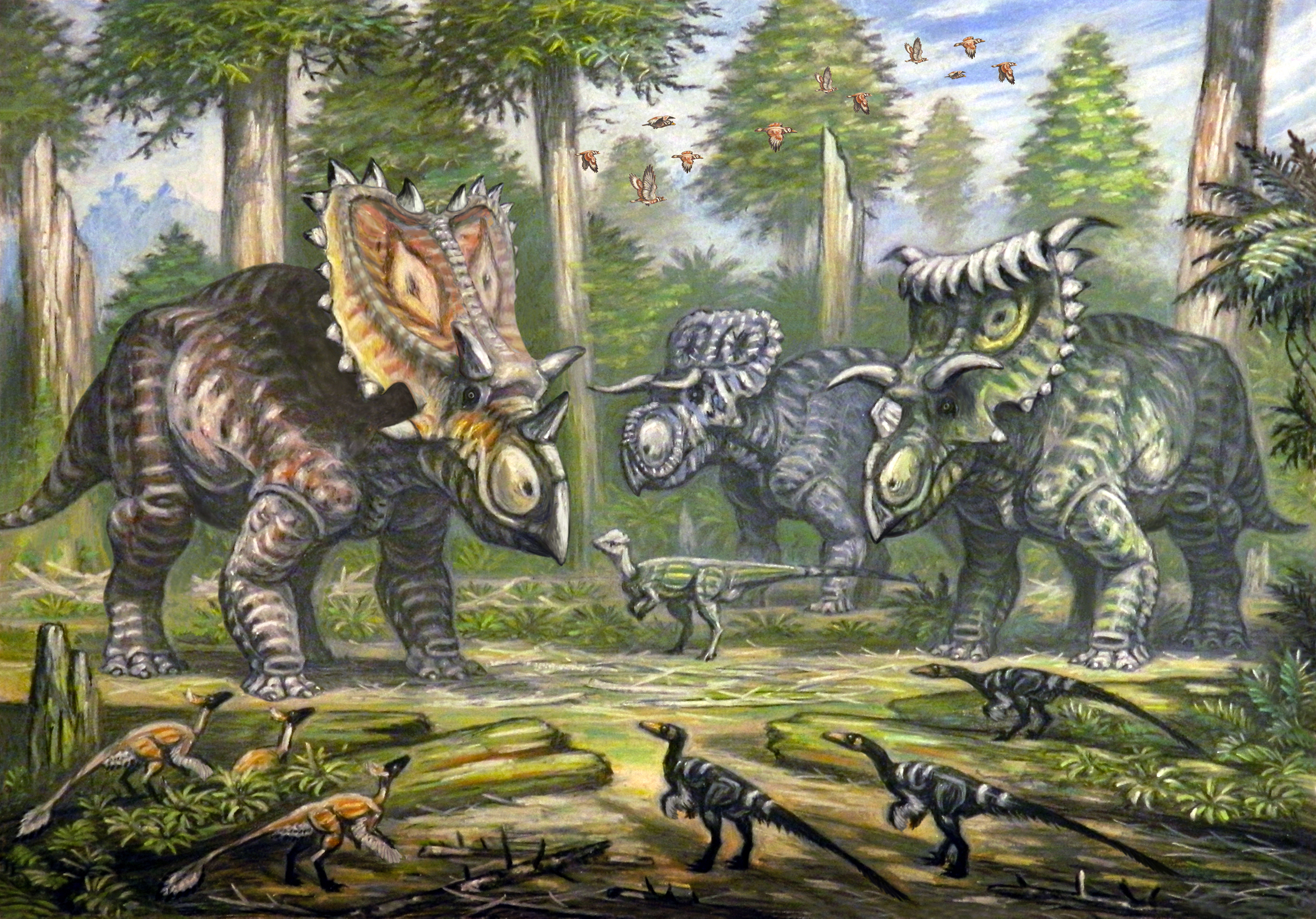
Hypothetical life restoration of three ceratopsids from the Kaiparowits Formation: Utahceratops, Nasutoceratops, and Kosmoceratops

In 2016, Lund and colleagues stated that the functional adaptations associated with the very short and deep front part of the skull of Nasutoceratops were unknown; they suggested these may have been related to a change toward more derived masticatory functions in basal ceratopsians. This morphology increased the mechanical advantage during mastication by moving the beak closer to the joint of the lower jaw. The narial region of Nasutoceratops was deep mainly due to the premaxilla and maxilla having steeply rising, enlarged contact surfaces, but the function of this is unknown. This feature may have been connected to absorbing larger bite forces. Pneumaticity in the snout region has been associated with a variety of functions in vertebrates such as moisture exchange, shock absorption, vocal resonance, and weight reduction, but the function in Nasutoceratops is unclear. Sampson stated in a 2013 press release that the large snout probably did not have anything to do with a heightened sense of smell, since olfactory sensors are located further back in the head, closer to the brain.

Ryan and colleagues proposed in 2017 that differences in jaw mechanics between nasutoceratopsins and centrosaurins may have prevented resource competition, which allowed them to coexist, or the rarity of nasutoceratopsins may have made them ineffective competitors. Ishikawa and colleagues noted in 2023 that only a single nasutoceratopsin specimen was recovered from each quarry in the Judith River Formation, which suggests they were solitary animals or rare in floodplain habitats, whereas other centrosaurines have been found in quarries with multiple individuals, indicating a gregarious lifestyle. The tall snouts and robust jaws of nasutoceratopsins also suggest distinct feeding habits.

In a 2017 Master's thesis, the paleontologist Nicole Marie Ridgwell described two coprolites (fossilized dung) from the Kaiparowits Formation which, due to their size, may have been produced by a member of one of three herbivorous dinosaur groups known from the formation: ceratopsians (including Nasutoceratops), hadrosaurs, or ankylosaurs (the rarest of the three groups). The coprolites contained fragments of angiosperm wood (which indicates a diet of woody browse); though there was previously little evidence of dinosaurs consuming angiosperms, these coprolites showed that dinosaurs adapted to feeding on them (angiosperms only became common in the Early Cretaceous, diversifying in the Late Cretaceous). The coprolites also contained traces of mollusc shell, arthropod cuticle, and lizard bone that may have been ingested along with the plant material. They were found near other herbivore coprolites that contained conifer wood. Ridgwell pointed out that the dental anatomies of ceratopsians and hadrosaurs (with dental batteries comprising continuously replaced teeth) were adapted to process large quantities of fibrous plants. The different diets represented by the coprolites may indicate niche partitioning among the herbivores of the Kaiparowits Formation ecosystem, or that there was seasonal variation in diet.

=== Function of skull ornamentation ===
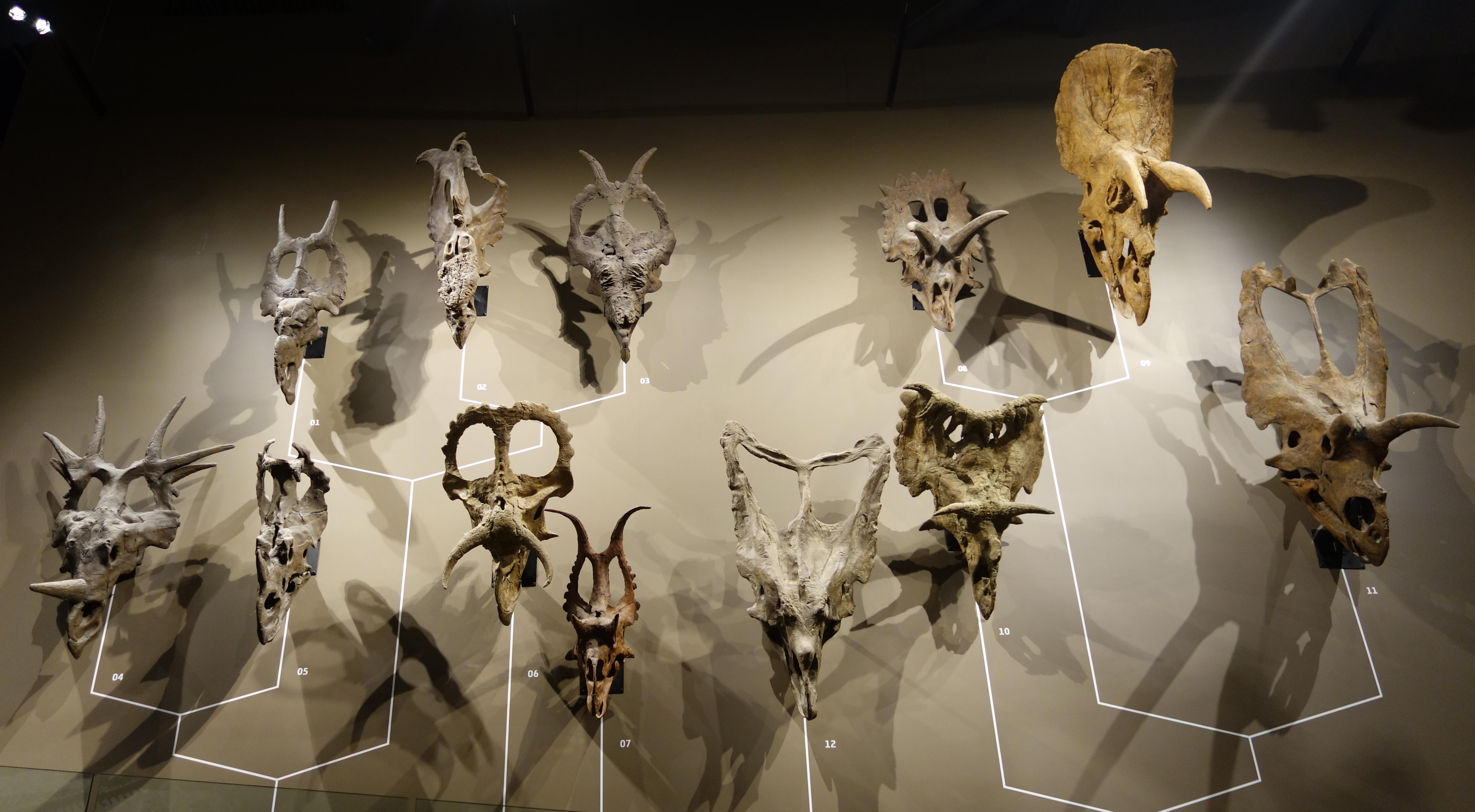
Ceratopsid skull casts positioned in a phylogenetic tree at UMNH; Nasutoceratops is at middle left (06).

Sampson and colleagues stated in 2013 that while various hypotheses about the function of ceratopsid skull ornamentation have been proposed, the consensus at the time was use in intraspecific signalling and intraspecific combat, with the debate focusing on either species recognition (driven by natural selection) or mate competition (driven by sexual selection). Other ideas have ranged from protection against predators and thermoregulation. They pointed out that either way, the evolutionary changes in the two centrosaurine clades were concentrated in different parts of the skull, with the clade that included Avaceratops and Nasutoceratops reducing frill ornamentation but elaborating the brow horns, and the clade that indluded Spinops and Pachyrhinosaurus reducing the brow horns but enlarging their nasal horns and frill ornamentation, which distributed their distinct signalling structures all across the skull roof. Loewen stated in the 2013 press release that the horns were probably used as visual signs of dominance, and as weapons against rivals when that was not enough.

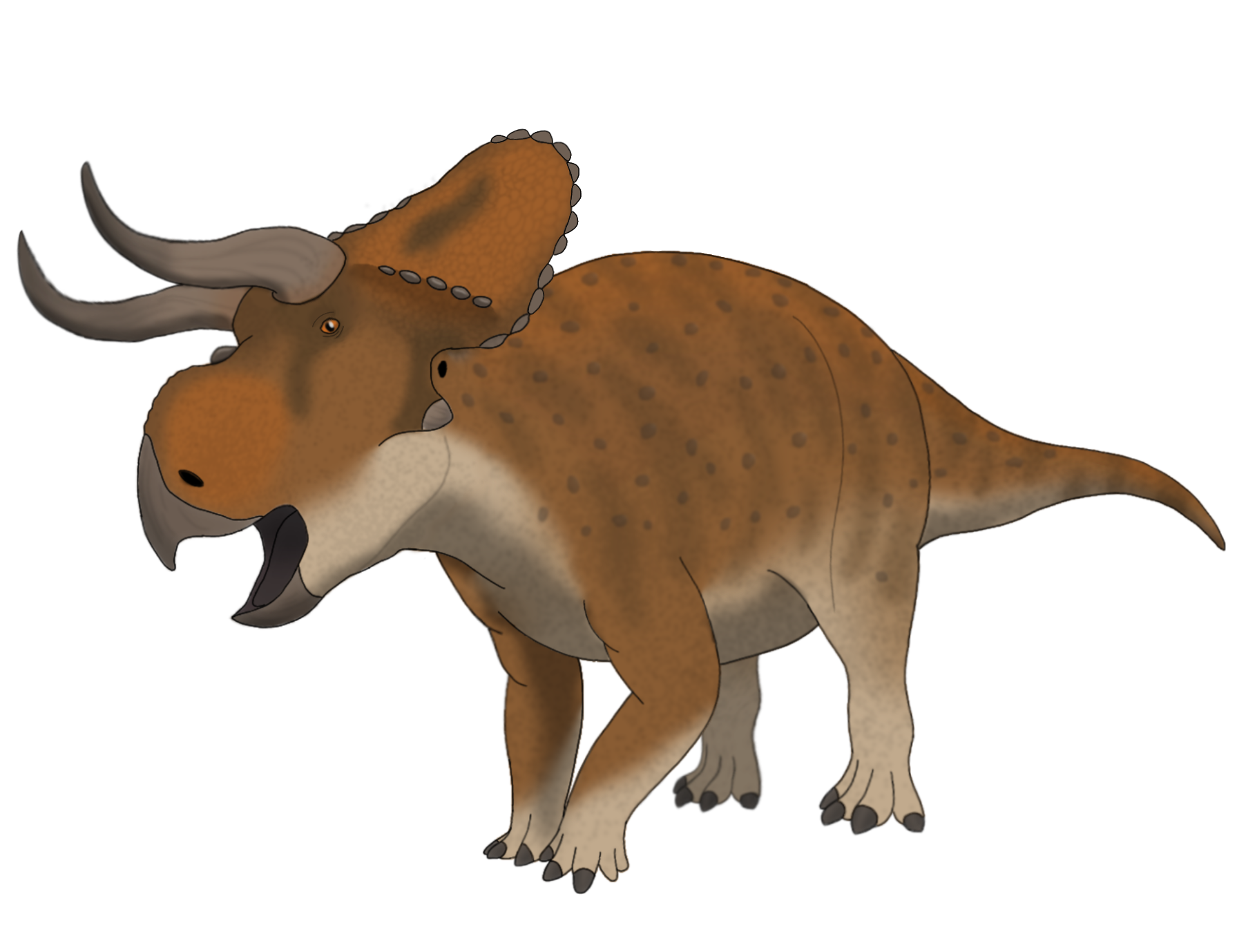
Hypothetical life restoration

In 2016, Lund and colleagues suggested that if the mate competition hypothesis applied to the very long and robust brow horns of Nasutoceratops, their orientation towards the front and sides and torsional twist may have enabled interlocking of horns with opponents of the same species, as seen in many modern bovids. They noted that the paleontologist Andrew A. Farke had earlier studied the function of ceratopsid brow horns by using scale models, and found three plausible horn locking positions for Triceratops that could also apply to Nasutoceratops; "single horn contact", "full horn locking", and "oblique horn locking". Farke and colleagues examined pathologies (signs of disease, such as injuries and malformations) in the skulls of Triceratops and Centrosaurus in 2009, and concluded that those in the former were consistent with trauma resulting from antagonistic behaviour, but found those of the latter less conclusive, and Lund and colleagues found that such a hypothesis could not be ruled out for Nasutoceratops. The paleontologist Gregory S. Paul suggested in 2016 that the forward directed horns of Nasutoceratops indicated a frontal thrusting action.

== Paleoenvironment ==
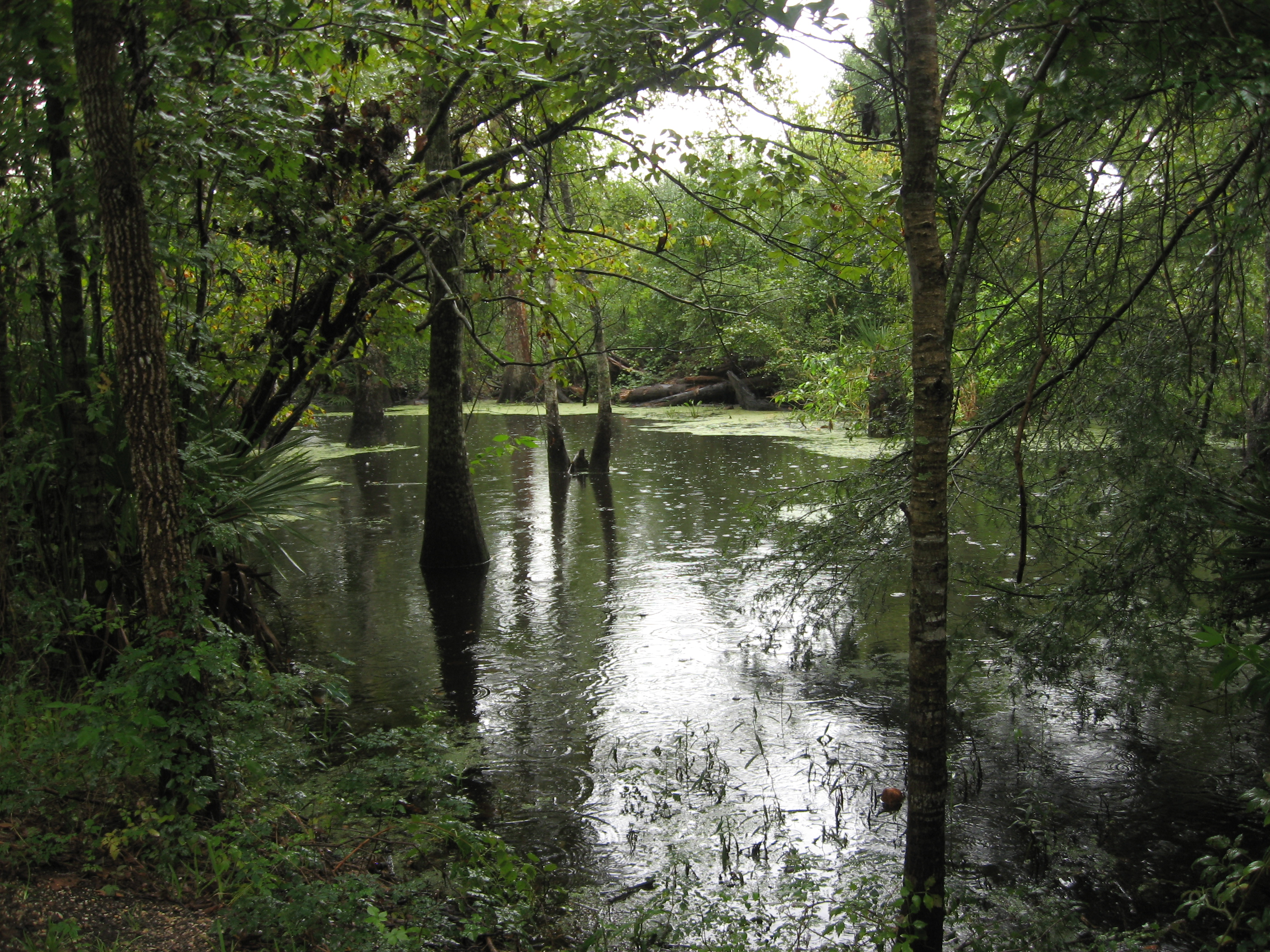
The swamplands of Louisiana, with which the Kaiparowits Formation environment has been compared.

Nasutoceratops is known from the Kaiparowits Formation of Utah, which dates to the late Campanian age of the Late Cretaceous epoch, and stratigraphically occurs in the formation's middle unit, which ranges 200–350 m (656.2–1,148.3 ft) in thickness, in sediments dating to 75.51–75.97 million years ago. Specimen UMNH VP 19469 was found lower in the middle unit than the holotype. The formation was deposited in the southern part of a basin (the Western Interior Basin) on the eastern margin of Laramidia within 100 km (62 mi) of the Western Interior Seaway, a shallow sea in the center of North America that divided the continent (the eastern landmass is known as Appalachia). The basin was broad, flat, crescent-shaped, and bounded by mountains on all sides except the Western Interior Seaway at the east. The formation represents an alluvial to coastal plain setting that was wet, humid, and dominated by large, deep channels with stable banks and perennial wetland swamps, ponds, and lakes. Rivers flowed across the plains and drained into the Western Interior Seaway; the Gulf Coast region of the United States has been proposed as a good modern analogue (such as the current day swamplands of Louisiana). The formation preserves a diverse and abundant range of fossils, including continental and aquatic animals, plants, and palynomorphs (organic microfossils).

Other ornithischian dinosaurs from the Kaiparowits Formation include ceratopsians such as the chasmosaurines Utahceratops and Kosmoceratops (and possibly a second yet unnamed centrosaurine), indeterminate pachycephalosaurs, the ankylosaurid Akainacephalus, an indeterminate nodosaurid, the hadrosaurs Gryposaurus and Parasaurolophus, and an indeterminate, basal neornithischian. Theropods include the tyrannosaurid Teratophoneus, the oviraptorosaur Hagryphus, an unnamed ornithomimid, the troodontid Talos, indeterminate dromaeosaurids, and the bird Avisaurus. Other vertebrates include crocodiles (such as Deinosuchus and Brachychampsa), turtles (such as Adocus and Basilemys), pterosaurs, lizards, snakes, amphibians, mammals, and fishes. The two most common groups of large vertebrates in the formation are hadrosaurs and ceratopsians (the latter representing about 14 percent of associated vertebrate fossils), which may either indicate their abundance in the Kaiparowits fauna or reflect preservation bias (a type of sampling bias) due to these groups also having the most robust skeletal elements. Eggs from dinosaurs, crocodiles, and turtles have also been found. The swamps and wetlands were dominated by cypress trees up to 30 m (98 ft) tall, ferns, and aquatic plants including giant duckweed, water lettuce, and other floating angiosperms. Better-drained areas were dominated by forests of dicot trees up to 10–20 m (33–66 ft) tall and occasional palms, with an understory including ferns. Well-drained areas further away from wet areas were dominated by conifers up to 30 m (98 ft) tall, with an understory consisting of cycads, small dicot trees or bushes, and possibly ferns.

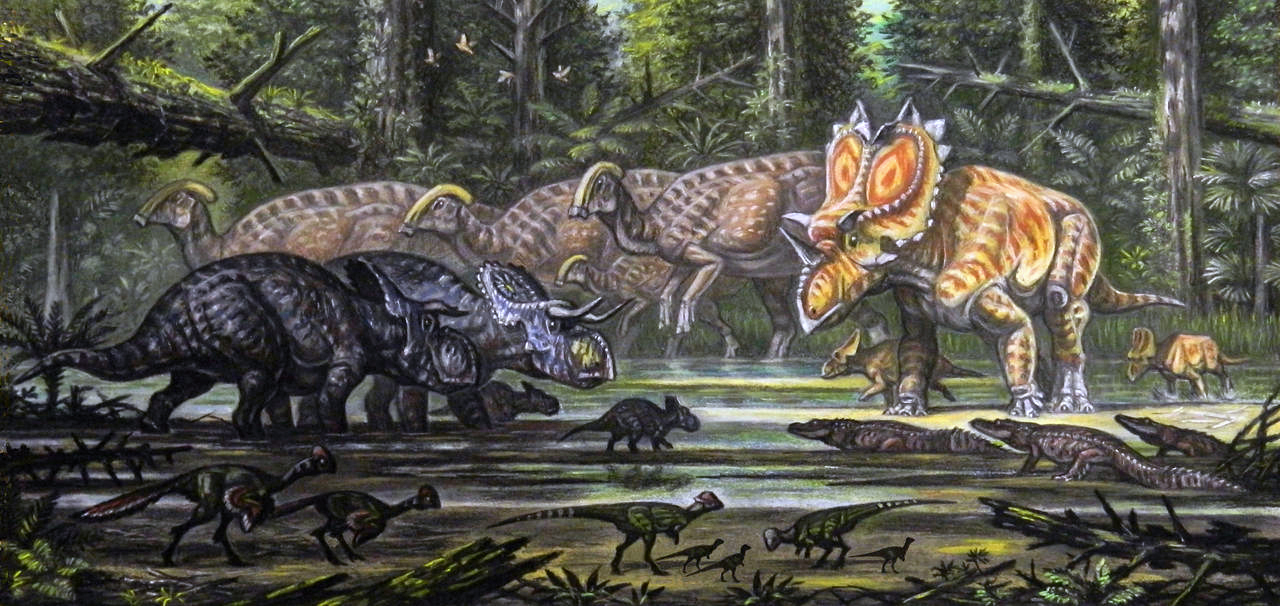
Hypothetical life restoration of a Nasutoceratops pair (left) and contemporary animals by a Kaiparowits Formation swamp

In 2010, the paleontologist Michael A. Getty and colleagues examined the taphonomy (changes occurring during decay and fossilization) of the holotype specimen and the sedimentological circumstances under which it was preserved. The more or less articulated specimen was found in a sandstone channel lithofacies (the rock record of a sedimentary environment), and may have been much more complete when it was deposited. While the skull and forelimb were in close association, most of the postcranial skeleton was disarticulated and displaced before being deposited, which is indicated by the random distribution of those bones around the skull. The sandstone that entombed the forelimb preserved patches of skin, which is very rare for ceratopsians, and it seems plausible that the carcass was partially articulated with flesh and skin when it was washed into a stream bed. The winnowing and displacement of most of the skeleton, which left just the skull and forelimb in articulation at the time of burial, would have resulted from some rotting and disarticulation in the river channel. The missing parts of the skull were eroded and lost. Specimen UMNH VP 19466 was found in a bonebed with a partial ankylosaur skeleton and a shell of the turtle Denazinemys.

== See also ==
- Timeline of ceratopsian research
