= Gamerabaena =

Gamerabaena Temporal range: Late Cretaceous

Scientific classification
- Kingdom: Animalia
- Phylum: Chordata
- Class: Reptilia
- Clade: Pantestudines
- Clade: Testudinata
- Clade: †Paracryptodira
- Family: †Baenidae
- Genus: †Gamerabaena; Lyson and Joyce, 2010

Species
- G. sonsalla Lyson and Joyce, 2010 (type)

Extinct genus of reptiles

Gamerabaena is an extinct genus of baenid turtle which existed in North Dakota during the late Cretaceous Period. It is known from a single fragmentary skull that was found in the Maastrichtian-age Hell Creek Formation. It contains the species Gamerabaena sonsalla. Gamerabaena is similar to the genus Palatobaena, but it differs in its lack of a posterior expansion of the triturating (or chewing) surface, a somewhat rectangular skull, and a wide angle between the maxillae. Gamerabaena also has a lingual ridge on the inner side of the jaw that is not seen in Palatobaena.

Gamerabaena is considered the sister taxon of Palatobaena and shares features with both Palatobaena and Plesiobaena. These features, which include slightly upturned eye sockets, are seen as intermediate between the two other genera. While Gamerabaena is known only from the skull, it may belong to the same species as "Baena" hayi, which is known primarily from the shell.

The genus is named after Gamera, a giant flying, fire-breathing turtle from a series of Japanese tokusatsu films.

== Phylogeny ==
Cladogram after Tyler R. Lyson and Walter G. Joyce (2009).

- - Pleurosternon bullockii
  - Glyptops plicatulus
  - Baenidae
    - Neurankylinae
      - Neurankylus eximius
      - Trinitichelys hiatti
    - Eubaeninae
      - Hayemys latifrons
      - Baenodda
        - Plesiobaenini
          - Plesiobaena antiqua
          - - Peckemys brinkman
            - - Cedrobaena putorius
              - - Gamerabaena sonsalla
                - - Palatobaena cohen
                  - - Palatobaena bairdi
                    - Palatobaena gaffneyi
        - Eubaenini
          - - Boremys pulchra
            - Boremys grandis
            - Eubaena cephalica
          - - Goleremys mckennai
            - - Stygiochelys estesi
              - - Baena arenosa
                - Chisternon undatum

== See also ==
- Sinemys gamera – another species of fossil turtle named after Gamera
