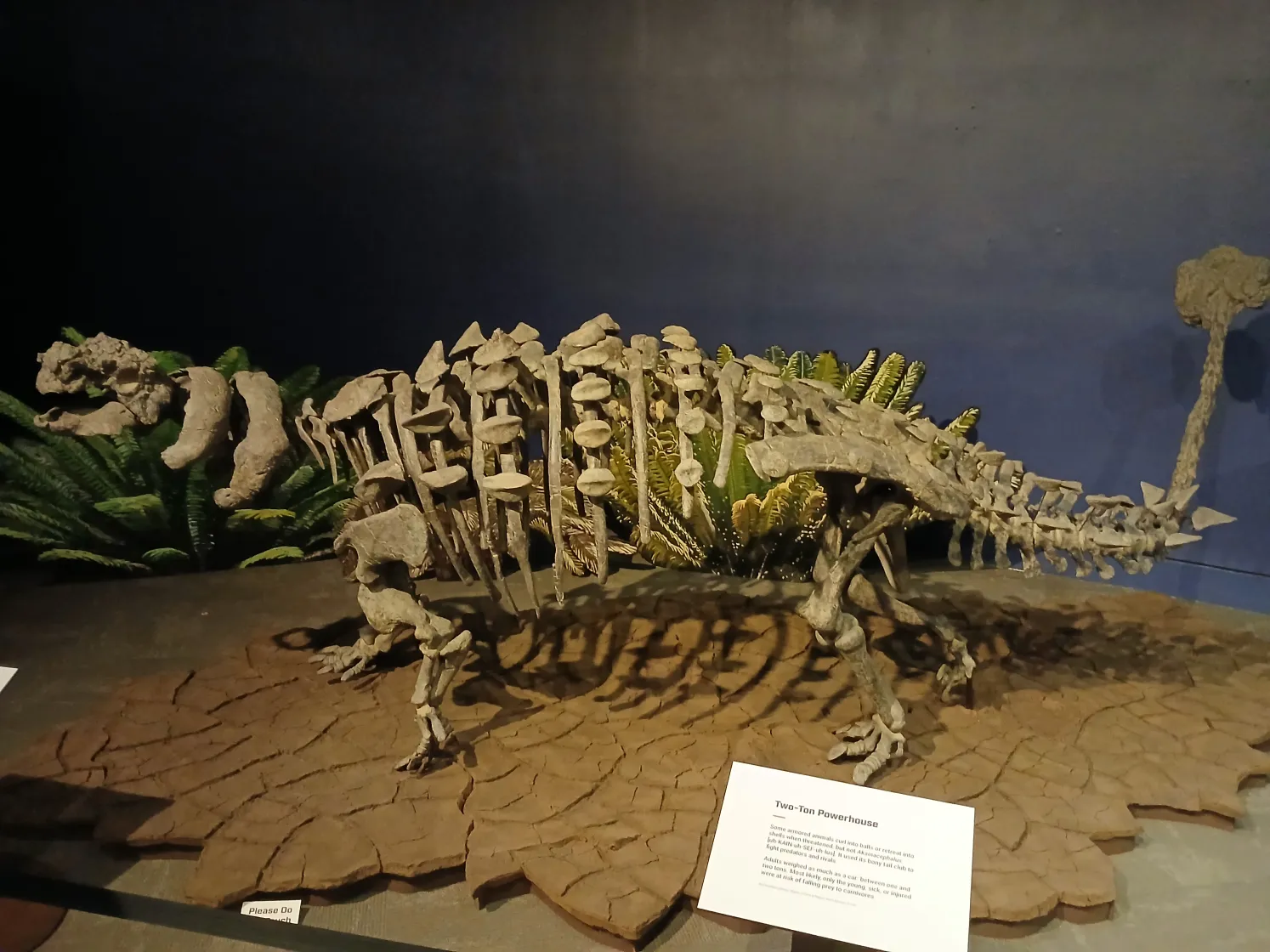
- Reconstructed skeleton

Scientific classification
- Kingdom: Animalia
- Phylum: Chordata
- Class: Reptilia
- Clade: Dinosauria
- Clade: †Ornithischia
- Clade: †Thyreophora
- Clade: †Ankylosauria
- Family: †Ankylosauridae
- Subfamily: †Ankylosaurinae
- Tribe: †Ankylosaurini
- Genus: †Akainacephalus; Wiersma and Irmis, 2018
- Species: †A. johnsoni

Binomial name
- †Akainacephalus johnsoni Wiersma and Irmis, 2018

= Akainacephalus =

Akainacephalus Temporal range: Late Cretaceous, 76.26 Ma

Ankylosaurid dinosaur genus from Late Cretaceous Utah

Akainacephalus (meaning "thorn head") is a monospecific genus of ankylosaurid dinosaur from southern Utah that lived during the Late Cretaceous (late Campanian, 76.26 Ma) in what is now the Horse Mountain Gryposaur Quarry of the Kaiparowits Formation. The type and only species, Akainacephalus johnsoni, is known from the most complete ankylosaur specimen ever discovered from southern Laramidia, including a complete skull, tail club, a number of osteoderms, limb elements and part of its pelvis, among other remains. It was described in 2018 by Jelle P. Wiersma and Randall B. Irmis. It is closely related and shares similar cranial anatomy to Nodocephalosaurus.

== Discovery and naming ==
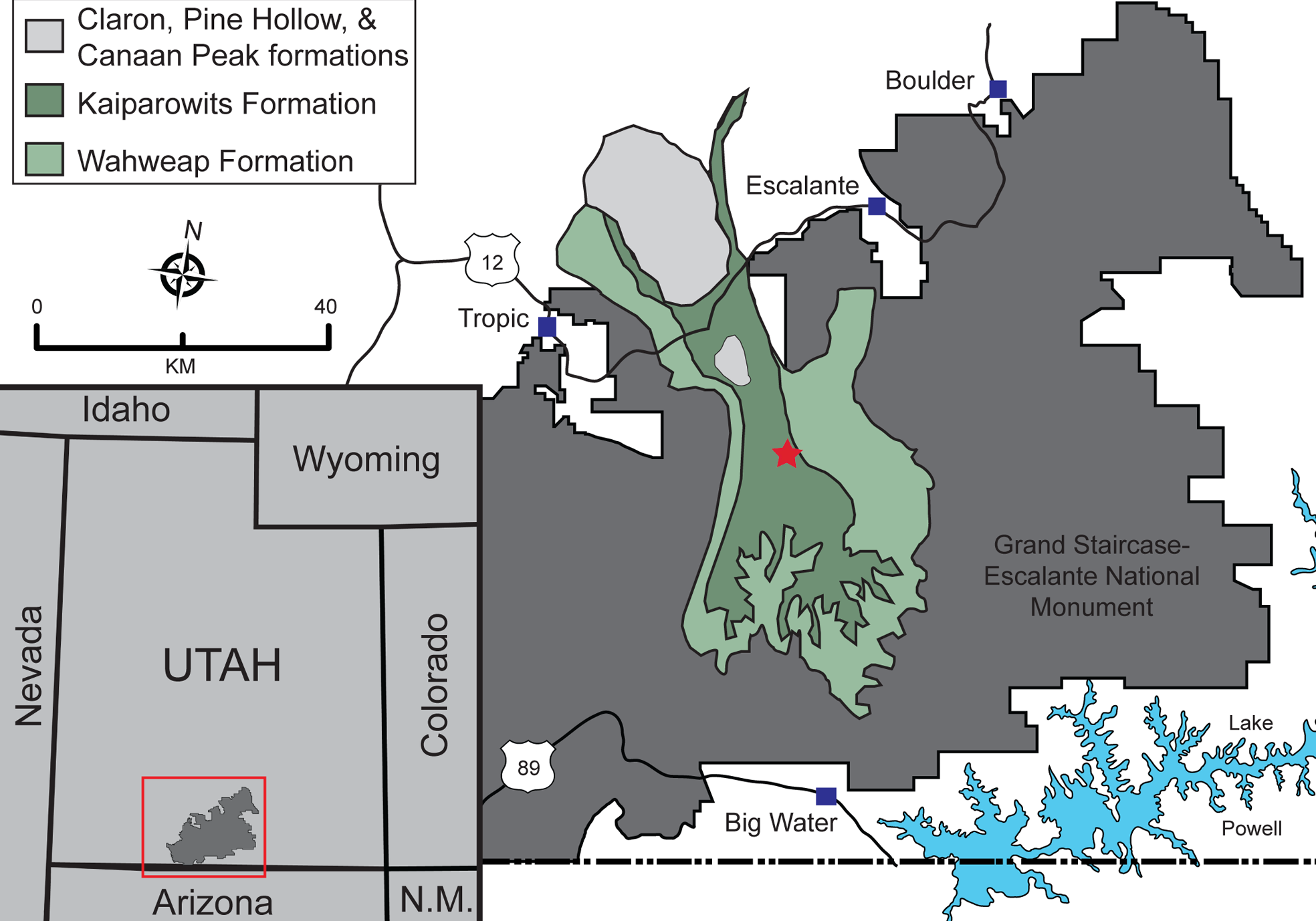
Map of the Grand Staircase–Escalante National Monument. Kaiparowits Formation is in dark green.

An almost complete skeleton of an ankylosaurid was excavated during the 2008, 2009, and 2010 field seasons from the Horse Mountain Gryposaur (HMG) Quarry in the Grand Staircase–Escalante National Monument, Kane County, Utah. The Horse Mountain Gryposaur Quarry represents a multitaxic and multidominant bonebed that has produced a mostly complete, partially articulated skeleton of the hadrosaurid Gryposaurus, the holotype of the baenid turtle Arvinachelys, an articulated skeleton of a small alligatoroid, and a partial skull of a small theropod. The bonebed is deposited in a fine- to medium-grained sandstone crevasse splay that is located within the lower section of the middle unit of the Kaiparowits Formation. The age of the layer is 76.26 ± 0.10 million years based on zircon dating. In 2014, the skull was subjected to a CT scan in order to reveal the internal anatomy. The specimen was subsequently described in 2018 by Jelle P. Wiersma and Randall B. Irmis.

The holotype specimen, UMNH VP 20202, consists of a skull, both mandibles, predentary, dorsal vertebrae, dorsosacral vertebrae, sacral vertebrae, caudosacral vertebra, caudal vertebrae, dorsal ribs, a complete tail club, both scapulae, coracoid, humerus, ulna, partial ilium, femur, tibia, fibula, phalanx, partial cervical osteoderm half rings, and dorsal and lateral osteoderms of various sizes and morphologies. It represents about 45% of the skeletal elements and is part of the collection of the Natural History Museum of Utah in Salt Lake City.

The generic name, Akainacephalus, is derived from the Greek words "akaina" (thorn or spine) and "kephalè" (head), in reference to the thornlike cranial caputegulae of the holotype skull. The specific name, johnsoni, honours Randy Johnson, a volunteer preparator at the Natural History Museum of Utah, who prepared the skull and lower jaws of the holotype.

== Description ==
=== Distinguishing traits ===
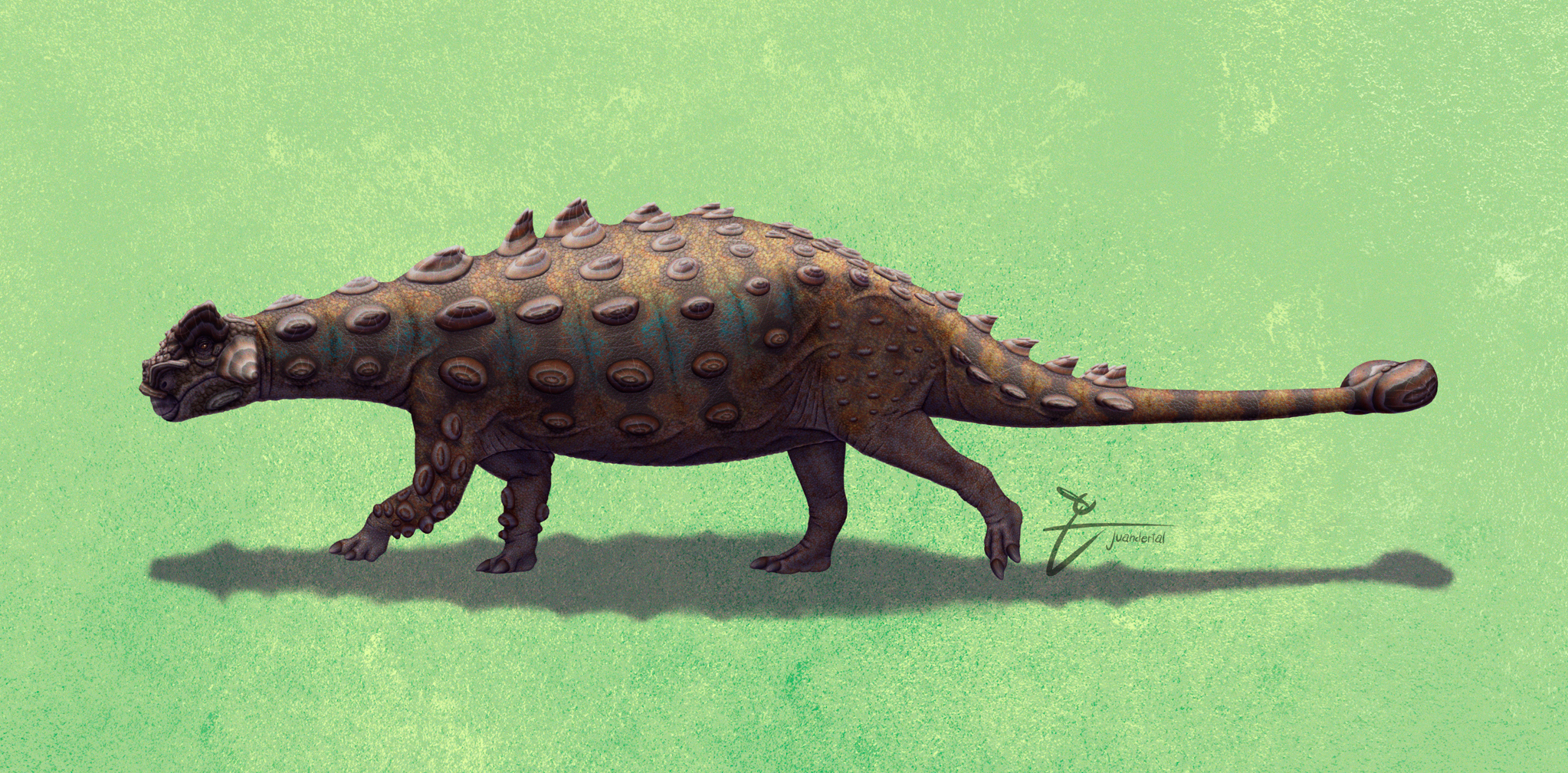
Life reconstruction

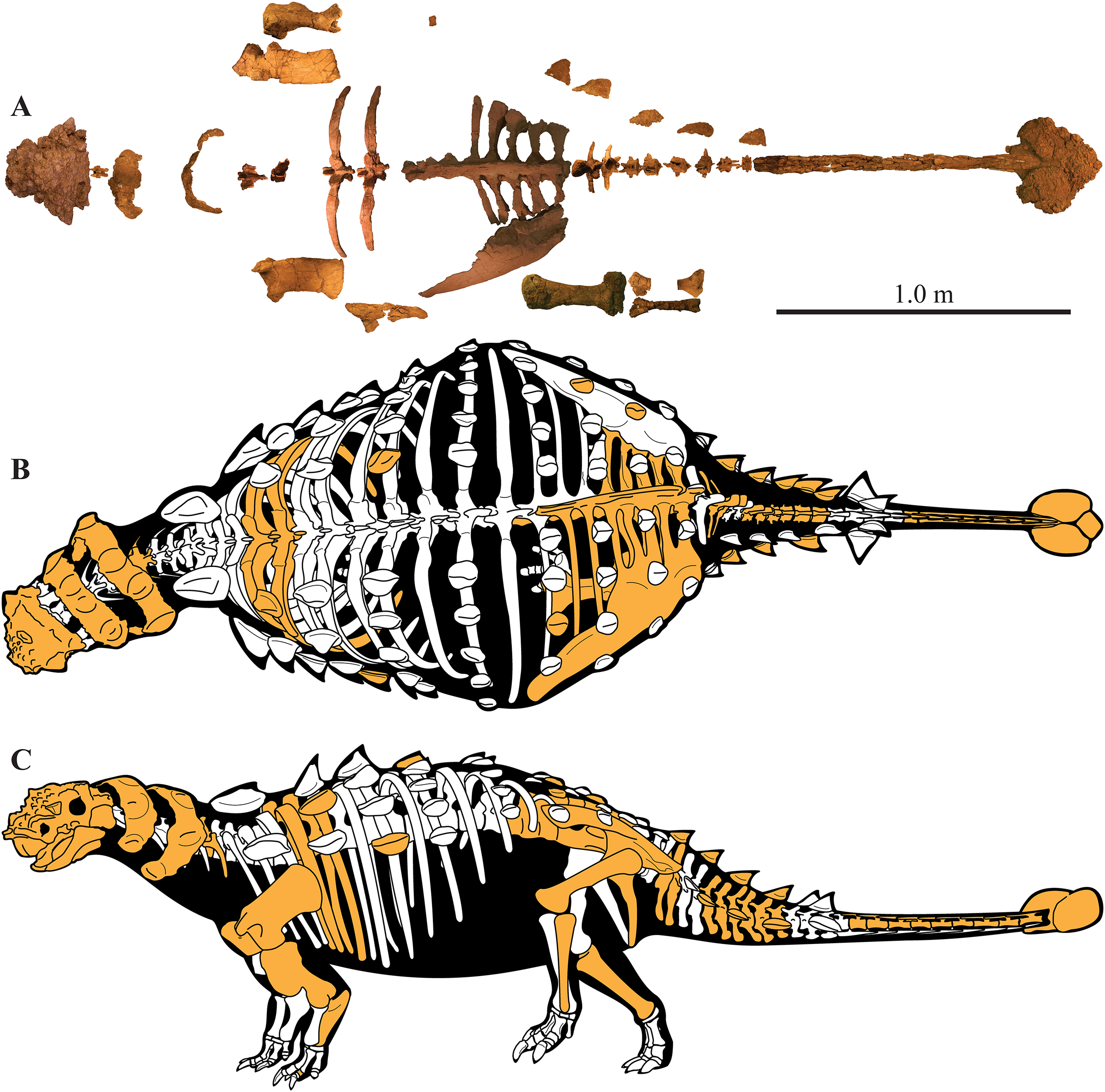
Preserved elements and skeletal reconstructions

The describing authors indicated several distinguishing traits. Some of these are autapomorphies, unique derived characters. The supraorbital bosses are massive in side view, forming a high back-swept ridge, also extending sideways over the eye socket, while encompassing the front top corner and the rear edge of the eye socket. The cheek horns are triangular, pointing almost vertically to below. On the frontal bones, a central large flat hexagonal osteoderm is present. The zone spanning the frontal bones and nasal bones is covered by symmetrically positioned, closely packed, pyramid-shaped and conical caputegulae. The nasal bones exhibit a distinct central row of conical caputegulae, symmetrically separated from the osteoderms above and to the sides of them. At the rear of the skull, the part of the foramen magnum formed by the basioccipital is located obliquely above and in front of the occipital condyle.

=== Cranium ===
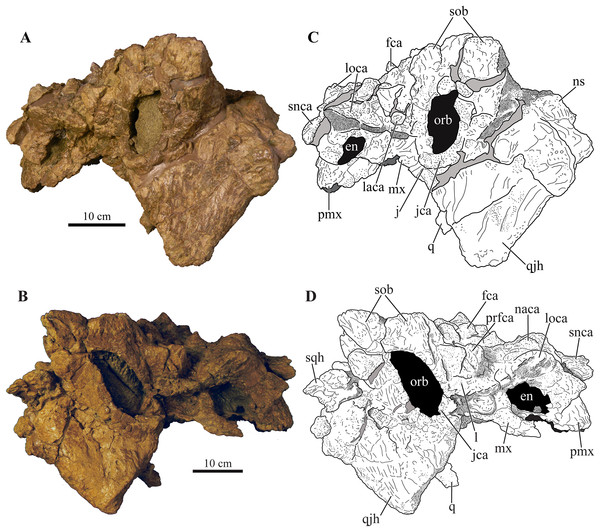
Skull of Akainacephalus in side views.

The skull of Akainacephalus has a unique suite of cranial ornamentation that consists of several symmetrical rows of small pyramidal and conical caputegulae along the dorsolateral surface of the skull. As in Nodocephalosaurus, the external nares are oriented towards the sides. The external nares are fully obscured in front view, a condition not seen in many Asian and Laramidian ankylosaurids, and are relatively small, tear-shaped openings. Positioned on the rear margin of the left nares is a small bony fragment as in Pinacosaurus and Minotaurasaurus which suggests the presence of internarial apertures. The external nares have upper and front margins that are bounded by the supranarial caputegulum. The orbits are almond-shaped and both jugals are slightly above the lacrimals due to anteroposterior deformation. The premaxillae slightly taper towards the front and form a narrow, U-shaped beak. The maxillae preserves 16 alveolar cavities each. As in other ankylosaurids and nodosaurids, the maxillae are concave towards the sides and together form an hourglass configuration. Like Nodocephalosaurus, the lacrimals are ornamented with a tetrahedral-shaped lacrimal caputegulum, although the lacrimal in Nodocephalosaurus is well defined in lateral view and has a rugose surface texture. The postorbitals have an ornamented side surface that forms the rear border of the orbit and is continuous with the posterodorsal ornamentation of the jugal. The jugals consist of a broad element that touches the front-most part of the quadratojugal and the rear margin of the maxilla. The jugal forms a shelf that is ornamented towards the sides with a small ridge of rugose co-ossified bone. The quadratojugal is a small wall of bone that projects towards the front and forms the front extension of the quadratojugal horn.

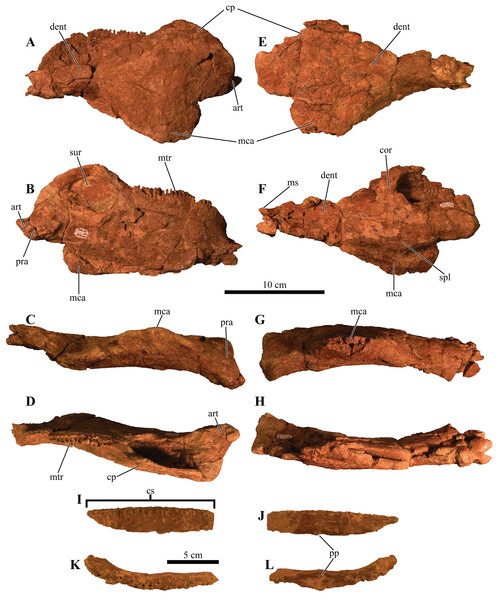
Mandibles and predentary.

The external nares are ornamented with a supranasal caputegulum that is arranged along the premaxillary beak at the back and the sides. The caputegulum has a smooth surface texture, with some rugosity, and a tetrahedral-shaped lacrimal caputegulum is present near it. Along the dorsal surface of the nasal region are eight caputegulae that are ordered in a symmetrical pattern, but are separated by a row of pyramid-like caputegulae. Large, hexagonal caputegulae form a sagittal midline row which terminate in an apex towards the rear and towards the sides of sagittal midline row is a row of both polygonal and pyramid-shaped caputegulae. The side projecting nasal caputegulum forms a flaring nostril in side view. Positioned on the sides of each prefrontal is a subtriangular caputegulum with a keeled apex, which is anterior to the anterior-most supraorbital boss. A caputegulum that has a hexagonal base and a bulbous shape is surrounded by six smaller caputegulae towards the sides and front, which are similar to the nasal caputegulae but are different to the large, posterior caputegulum. The nuchal shelf has little rugosity and three, poorly preserved nuchal caputegulae, which vary between subrounded to elongate polygonal, are present on the posterior-most portion. The circumorbital complex consists of a supraorbital horn, a lacrimal caputegulum, a jugal osteoderm, and the thickened rim along the posterior margin of the orbital. The postorbital horn is formed by the fused anterior and posterior supraorbital caputegulae. Due to the damaged squamosal horns and more vertically oriented quadratojugal horns, it is unknown if Akainacephalus had squamosal horns and quadratojugal horns that exceeded the width of the postorbital horns. The postorbital horns are triangular towards the back, with a rugose and bulbous surface texture. The lacrimal caputegulum is a small caputegulum with a small surface texture that is arranged towards the underside of the supraorbital boss, while the jugal caputegulum is concave towards the underside and extends towards the sides which creates a small shelf. The quadrates are visible towards the sides. A subtriangular caputegulum with a blunt keel is present on the mandible and is shorter than that of other ankylosaurids.

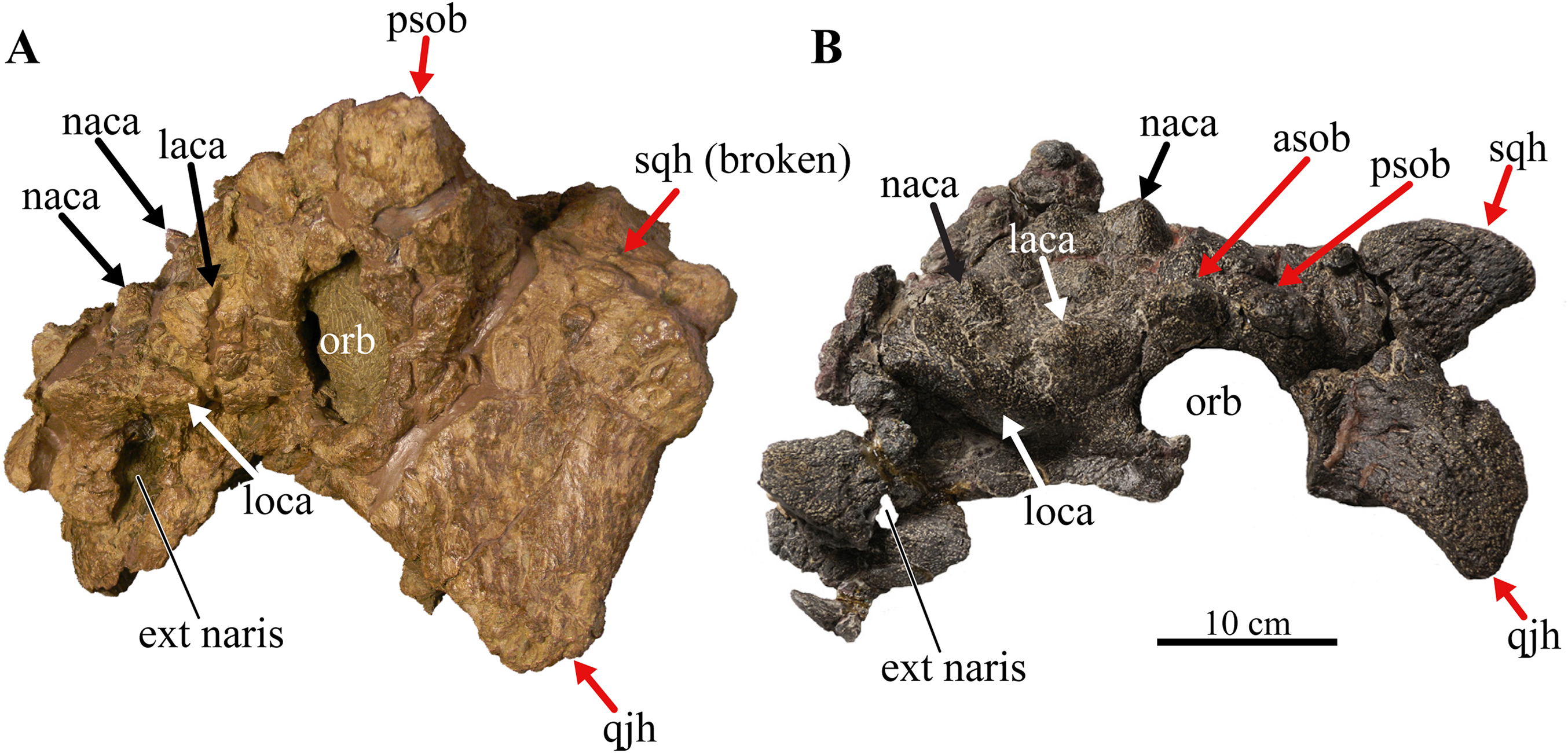
Comparison of Akainacephalus (left) and Nodocephalosaurus.

The quadrates have a shaft that expands to the sides and the middle to touch the middle face of the quadratojugals and the side faces of the pterygoids. Additionally, the quadrates are relatively robust and have a strong inclination towards the front of in side view. The predentary forms the mandibular counterpart to the premaxillary rostrum and articulates with the mandibular symphysis. In addition, the rear end of the predentary has a smooth surface texture. As in other ankylosaurids, the predentary of Akainacephalus is transversely almost straight. The total number of alveoli is unknown as they have been eroded away. The surangular, along with the posterior margin of the dentary, contributes to the tallest portion of the mandible and forms the coronoid process. The prearticular comprises the retroarticular process, along with the surangular.

=== Postcrania ===
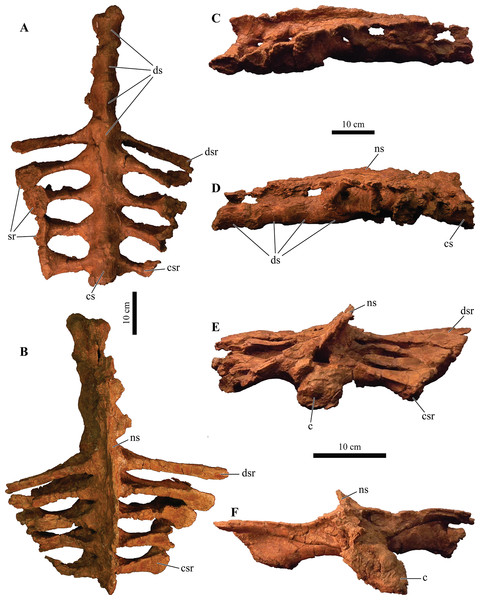
Sacrum and caudosacral vertebrae.

The posterior cervical vertebra has a spool-shaped centrum and a distinct keel on the ventral side. The dorsal vertebrae centra are spool-shaped and appear oblong towards the front and back as they are compressed towards the sides. However, the dorsal vertebrae of the mid-dorsal series show minor deformation. Unlike other ankylosaurids, the underside of the posterior surface of the centrum possesses a recurved, hook-like projection, which is followed by a longitudinal keel. Some of the dorsal vertebrae preserve portions of the fused ribs. The ribs that are fused to the dorsal vertebrae are T-shaped in cross section. The synsacrum consists of four dorsosacral, three sacral vertebrae and a single caudosacral vertebra, which are all fused along the centra and the neural spines. The sutural contacts are nearly concealed between individual vertebrae, which may be an ontogenetic feature. The dorsosacral vertebrae have short ribs that are fused to the centrum and transverse processes. These ribs, along with the sacral ribs, form broad contact surfaces that articulate with the ilium. The sacral ribs have a much less pronounced T-shaped cross section as the dorsal surfaces are less developed horizontally, unlike the ribs on the dorsosacral vertebrae. The caudal vertebrae have a short but tall boot and centra that have anterior and posterior articular surfaces that are spool-shaped and are slightly amphicoelous. The neural spines of the caudal vertebrae are tall and the centra of all proximal caudal vertebra are ellipsoid in shape, with the exception of the more distal caudal vertebrae in the proximal series as they are more round. The proximal ribs have dorsal surfaces that expand horizontally to form a T- or L-shaped cross-section, with three proximal ribs having an L-shaped cross-section and arch towards the underside. The proximal ribs with a T-shaped cross section have a wide horizontal expansion on the upper side of both sides of the ribs and arch less sharply, unlike the L-shaped ribs, which suggests they were positioned more towards the front of the vertebral column.

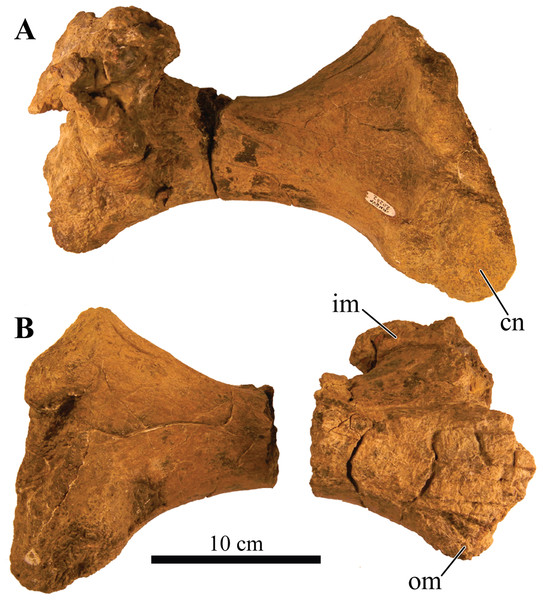
Tibia in anterior and posterior views.

The scapulae are curved outward towards the sides and curve inwards towards the middle. The acromion process of the scapula is positioned directly above the glenoid fossa and projects exactly upright to the side surfaces of the scapular blade. The scapular blade has a distinct surface on the ventral surface that would have supported the muscle M. triceps longus caudalis. The scapular blade is paddle-shaped with a convex distal margin in side view. The coracoid is square in shape and is fused to the right scapula. The humerus has an enlarged deltopectoral crest which is soon followed by a thick humeral shaft. A large projecting process is present towards the back and underside of the humeral head, which is present in some other ankylosaurids but are expressed to a lesser extent. On the side of the deltopectoral crest is large yet round protuberance which forms the articulation surface for the muscle M. latissimus dorsi. The only remains of the left ulna is the olecranon process and a partial shaft with the radial notch morphology being similar to that of other ankylosaurs. Towards the side margins, the ilium is concave and nearly straight towards the middle. Towards the middle of the ilium is a concave sulcus which forms a closed acetabulum. As with other ankylosaurids, the right ischium is Y-shaped towards the sides and in medial view, and consists of a shaft that is compressed towards the sides with no anterior curvature. A small protuberance on the dorsal surface is formed between the femoral head and the greater trochanter. In Akainacephalus and all other Late Cretaceous Laramidian ankylosaurids, the femoral head is oriented horizontally. Although the fibula is very poor as it experienced severe breakage and surface weathering, it was long and narrow. The pedal phalanx is transversely wider than long. In addition, the pedal phalanx is concave along the front and back articular surfaces.

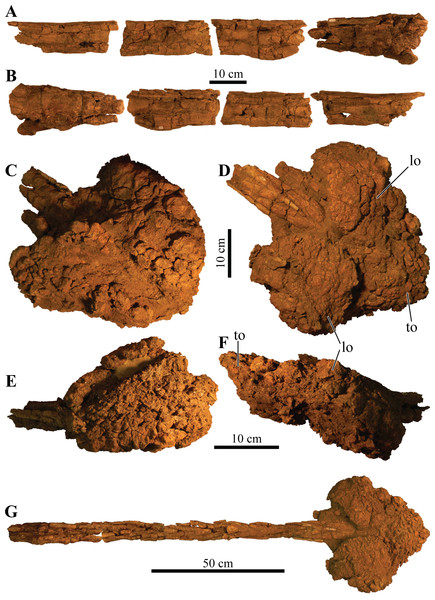
Tail club handle and knob.

The tail club is made up of the handle, which consists of eleven fused caudal vertebrae as in Dyoplosaurus, and the knob, which consists of only two lateral osteoderms and a single distal osteoderm. Each individual caudal vertebra is nearly twice as long as wide and have a spool-shaped centra. As with other ankylosaurid tail clubs, the handle is reinforced by elongated prezygapophyses which extend across for nearly half of the length of the next vertebra. The elongated prezygapophyses also interlock with the shorter postzygapophyses to help reinforce the handle. Each chevron of the handle interlocks with the adjacent chevron and are compressed in a way to which they look like elongated rods in lateral view. In addition, the chevrons are v-shaped structures that are fused onto the underside of the centra of the caudal vertebrae. Fused onto the two posterior-most caudal vertebrae is the tail club knob. The knob itself displays an overall subtriangular morphology in dorsal and ventral view, and is composed of two major osteoderms and a single minor osteoderm. As in Euoplocephalus and Ankylosaurus, the major osteoderms are longer from front to back than they are wide from side to side. The major osteoderms are rounded towards the side margins and are convex, unlike in Anodontosaurus. The minor osteoderm is far smaller than the major osteoderms, transversely wider than it is long, and diamond-shaped.

=== Osteoderms ===
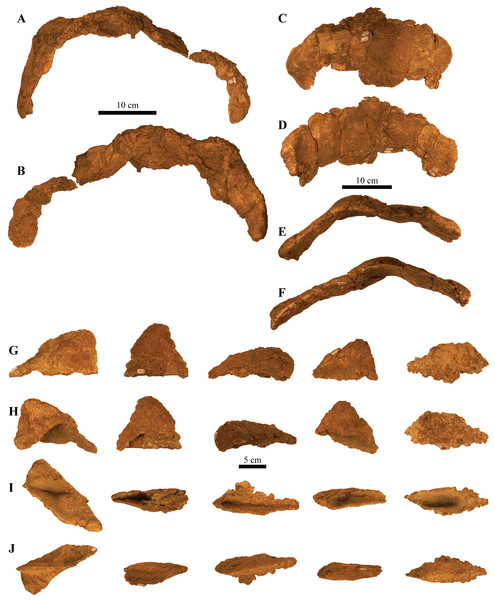
Cervical half rings and other noncervical osteoderms.

Both the anterior cervical half ring and posterior cervical half ring are preserved, but the anterior and posterior margins of both half rings are broken. Each cervical half ring is composed of six individual osteoderms, which are fused to the upper surfaces of the half rings and lack saw-tooth sutures. The loci present on the cervical half rings are bulbous and oval, and accommodate the secondary osteoderms, which were also oval in shape.

Only 14 noncervical osteoderms are known and are all tall with dorsal margins that are strongly keeled. Most of the osteoderms would have been positioned along the back and sides of the body, with some osteoderms possibly being positioned on the forelimbs. Of the 14 osteoderms preserved, three distinct morphologies are known which include a "pup-tent" shaped osteoderm with keels that are S-twisted and have a backswept apex (type 1), triangular osteoderms that are compressed dorsoventrally (type 2), and flat-based osteoderms that have a keel that is off-centred and longitudinal (type 5). Type 1 osteoderms are represent by 5 mostly incomplete osteoderms which are asymmetrical and have rounded apexes. These osteoderms would have been positioned on the thoracic or pectoral region of the body. The surface texture of these type 1 osteoderms vary as some are minimally rugose while others are rugose and with densely distributed, shallow pitting. Type 2 osteoderms are represented by 8 partial osteoderms which all vary in size and have a surface texture which is slightly rugose with minimal pitting. The type 2 osteoderms have a morphology which is typically seen in osteoderms that are positioned along the sides of the thorax and tail, as seen in specimens of Tarchia, Saichania and Scolosaurus. Type 5 osteoderms are represented by a singular, fragmentary osteoderm that has an off-centred straight keel and a round, flat base. The overall morphology of the osteoderm resembles the osteoderms that are positioned dorsally in Scolosaurus. The surface texture of the osteoderm is smooth with small, shallow pitting.

== Classification ==
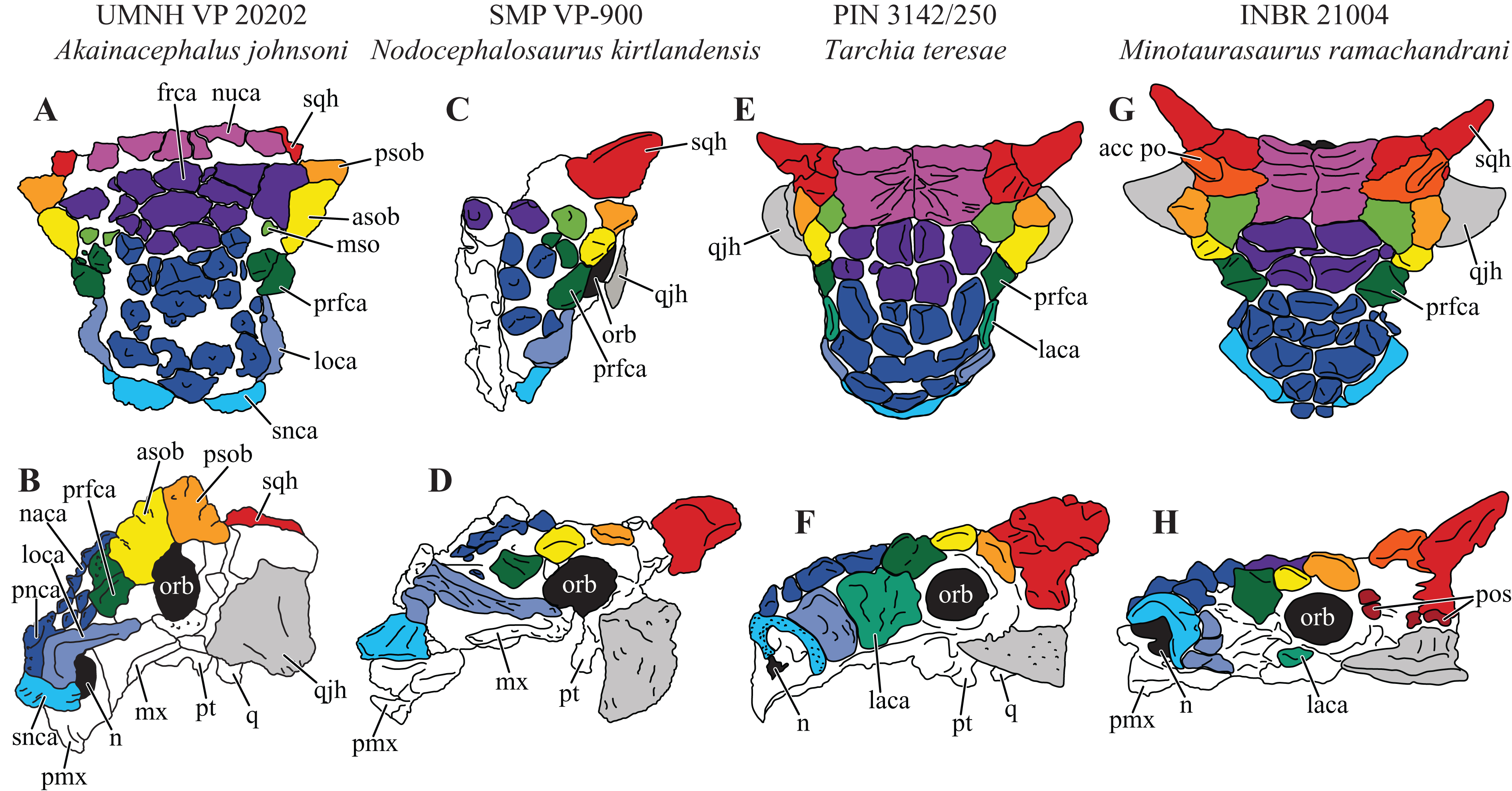
The skull ornamentation of Akainacephalus (left) compared to its close relatives (from left to right): Nodocephalosaurus, Tarchia, and Minotaurasaurus

Wiersma and Irmis (2018) found Akainacephalus to be within a southern Laramidian clade containing Nodocephalosaurus that is nested within Asian taxa rather than other Laramidian taxa and suggested that this clade was a separate biogeographic dispersal event from Asia independent from the main radiation of Laramidian ankylosaurids. The discovery indicates a strong case for provincialism between dinosaur populations in Northern and Southern Laramidia. Furthermore, the discovery of Akainacephalus also indicates at least two faunal migrations between Asia and North America, created when dropping sea levels allowed migrations between the continents via the Beringian Land Bridge during or earlier than the Campanian stage. However, Park et al. (2019) found both Akainacephalus and Nodocephalosaurus to be basal to Saichania, Talarurus, Tarchia and Zaraapelta, which suggests that a migration occurred before the Cenomanian stage and that ankylosaurines dispersed at least twice from Asia to Western North America. Frauenfelder et al. (2022) recovered Akainacephalus as sister taxon to two clades, with one of the clades consisting of Tsagantegia, Nodocephalosaurus and Talarurus while the other consists of more deeply nested taxa such as Saichania, Pinacosaurus, Scolosaurus, Anodontosaurus, Euoplocephalus and Ankylosaurus.

A phylogenetic analysis conducted by Wiersma and Irmis (2018) is reproduced below.

- Ankylosauridae
  - Gobisaurus
  - - Zhongyuansaurus
    - - Shamosaurus
      - - Tsagantegia
        - - Crichtonsaurus
          - - Pinacosaurus mephistocephalus
            - Zaraapelta
            - - Tianzhenosaurus
              - - Pinacosaurus grangeri
                - - Saichania
                  - - Tarchia gigantea
                    - - - Nodocephalosaurus
                        - Akainacephalus
                      - - Minotaurasaurus
                        - Tarchia kielanae
                        - Shanxia
                    - - Euoplocephalus
                      - Oohkotokia
                      - Scolosaurus
                      - Ziapelta
                      - Anodontosaurus
                      - Ankylosaurus
                      - Dyoplosaurus

== Paleoenvironment ==
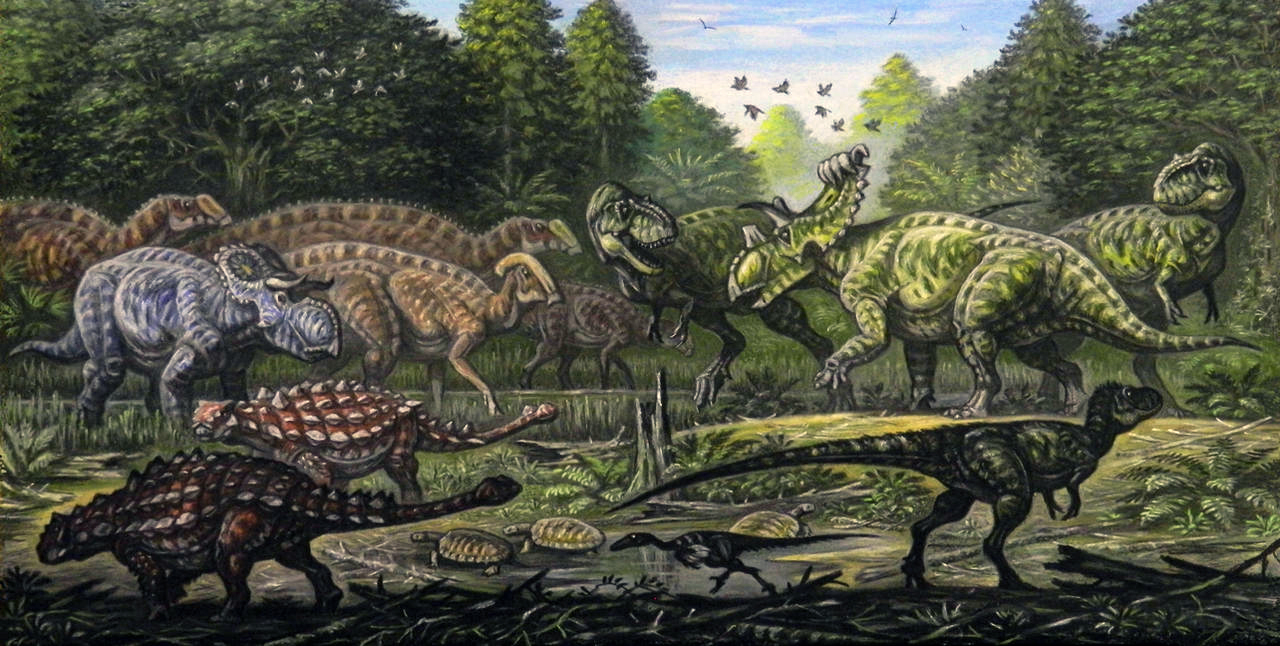
Akainacephalus (lower left) with contemporary dinosaurs of the Kaiparowits Formation

Akainacephalus is known from the middle unit of the Kaiparowits Formation which has been dated to the upper Campanian stage, 76.26 ± 0.10 Ma. The age of the Kaiparowits Formation makes it contemporaneous with dinosaur-bearing strata from the Dinosaur Park, Judith River, Two Medicine, Fruitland, Kirtland, and Aguja Formation. The Kaiparowits Formation preserves a unique record of Late Cretaceous terrestrial vertebrate ecosystems in the Western Interior of North America as it was deposited in a wet alluvial to coastal plain setting that was dominated by large river channels, ponds, lakes, and wetlands. The rivers flowed across the wet alluvial to coastal plain setting and were drained into the Western Interior Seaway. The climate was wet and humid, and supported an abundant and diverse range of organisms. The presence of aquatic molluscs and abundance of aquatic vertebrates and plants testifies to the wet nature of the alluvial setting.

Akainacephalus coexisted with other dinosaurs, such as the saurolophine hadrosaurid Gryposaurus monumentensis, the lambeosaurine hadrosaurid Parasaurolophus cyrtocristatus, an indeterminate brachylophosaurin, the chasmosaurine ceratopsids Utahceratops and Kosmoceratops, the centrosaurine ceratopsid Nasutoceratops, the ankylosaurine ankylosaurid Anodontosaurus, an indeterminate nodosaurid, an indeterminate ornithopod, the orodromine thescelosaurid "Skaladromeus", the caenagnathid Hagryphus, the troodontid Talos, the enantiornithine avisaurid Mirarce, the tyrannosaurid Teratophoneus, and an indeterminate ornithomimid. Non-dinosaur taxa contemporaneous with Akainacephalus include the baenid turtles Boremys, Arvinachelys, Denazinemys, Neurankylus and Thescelus, the paracryptodire turtle Compsemys, the adocid turtle Adocus, the nanhsiungchelyid Basilemys, the soft shell turtle Helopanoplia, the alligatoroids Deinosuchus and Leidyosuchus, and an indeterminate azhdarchid pterosaur.

== See also ==
- 2018 in paleontology
- Timeline of ankylosaur research
