= Denazinemys =

Denazinemys Temporal range: Late Cretaceous, 75–66 Ma

Scientific classification
- Kingdom: Animalia
- Phylum: Chordata
- Class: Reptilia
- Clade: Pantestudines
- Clade: Testudinata
- Clade: †Paracryptodira
- Family: †Baenidae
- Genus: †Denazinemys; Lucas and Sullivan, 2006
- Species: †D. nodosa

Binomial name
- †Denazinemys nodosa (Gilmore, 1916)

Synonyms
- Baena nodosa Gilmore, 1916

Extinct genus of baenid turtles

Denazinemys was a genus of baenid turtle that lived in the present-day southwestern United States during the Late Cretaceous. The type and only known species is D. nodosa.

== History of discovery ==
The holotype specimen, which D. nodosa was based on, USNM 8345, consists of a partial carapace and plastron from the upper Campanian-aged Kirtland Formation. Numerous shell fragments from various formations were also assigned to Denazinemys nodosa, based on the welted structure of the shell surface. However, with the exception of relatively complete specimens from the Fruitland Formation and the Kaiparowits Formation, Spicher et al. (2023) questioned the attributed specimens from other formations, as they are too fragmentary to distinguish differences in the structure of the welted shell surface. As it is not yet possible to identify these fragments precisely (several species of Baenidae having this same feature on their shell surface), the researchers restricted Denazinemys nodosa to the Upper Campanian. In 2025, other specimens assigned to D. nodosa have been reported from the Aguja Formation and the Javelina Formation.

== Description ==
Previously, Scabremys ornata was assigned to Denazinemys as D. ornata. Below are the features found in Denazinemys distinguishing the two genera:

- a carapace that is sub-triangular with widest dimension posteriorly;
- prepleurals present and touching the first vertebrae medially;
- the first vertebrae an irregular hexagonal shape with the greatest width posteriorly, contacting anterior second vertebrae;
- extracervicals lateral to the primary cervicals, the cervicals being sub-divided;
- and carapace nodes irregular and not forming distinct ridges.

== Classification ==
Denazinemys is a baenid along with Plesiobaena, Boremys, Scabremys, Baena and Chisternon.

Below is a cladogram made by Sullivan et al. in 2013 showing the relations of Denazinemys: (note: Boremys pulchra is partly a junior synonym of Boremys grandis)

- Baenidae
  - hypothetical ancestor
  - Neurankylus eximius
  - Trintichelys hiatti
  - Baenodda
    - Plesiobaena antiqua
    - - Scabremys ornata
      - - Boremys pulchra
        - - Chisternon undatum
          - - Baena arenosa
            - Denazinemys nodosa
