= Kaiparowits Formation =

Rock formation in the United States

- Stratigraphic range: Campanian 77.3–72.8 Ma
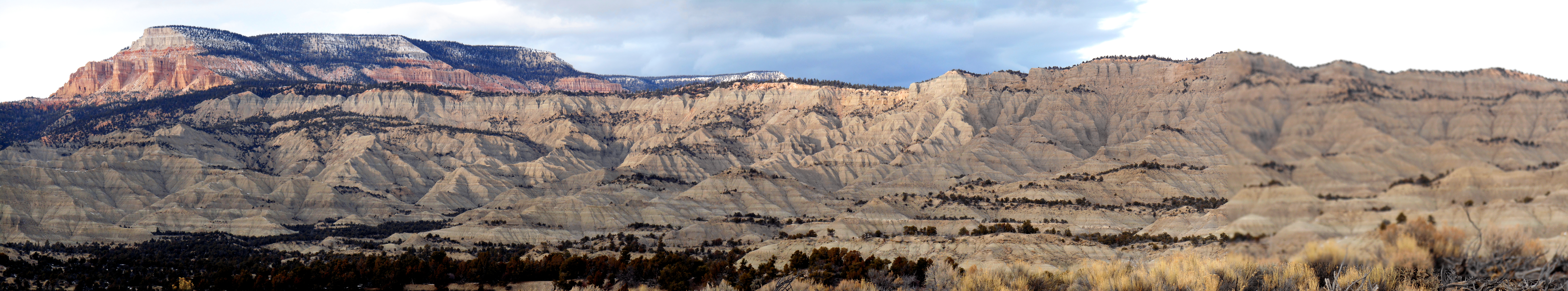
- Fluvial deposits of the Kaiparowits Formation at "The Blues".
- Type: Geological formation
- Thickness: 790 m (2,600 ft)

Lithology
- Primary: Mudstone, sandstone

Location
- Coordinates: 37°24′0″N 111°41′0″W
- Region: Utah
- Country: United States
- Kaiparowits Formation (the United States) Kaiparowits Formation (Utah)

The Kaiparowits Formation is a sedimentary rock formation found in the Kaiparowits Plateau in Grand Staircase–Escalante National Monument, in the southern part of Utah in the western United States. It is over 2800 feet (850 m) thick, and is Campanian in age. This Upper Cretaceous formation was formed from alluvial floodplains of large rivers in coastal southern Laramidia; sandstone beds are the deposit of rivers, and mudstone beds represent floodplain deposits. It is fossiliferous, with most specimens from the lower half of the formation, but exploration is only comparatively recent, with most work being done since 1982. It has been estimated that less than 10% of the Kaiparowits formation has been explored for fossils. The Natural History Museum of Utah has conducted most fieldwork.

== Age ==
Traditionally, the Kaiparowits Formation has been considered to be roughly equivalent in age to the northern Dinosaur Park Formation. This, combined with the differences in fauna between the two formations, has led some scientists, most notably Scott Sampson, to conclude that there was some barrier separating northern and southern Laramidia at this time. However, preliminary re-calibration of late Cretaceous formation correlations suggests that the upper part of the Kaiparowits, where many of the unique species are found, is actually younger than the Dinosaur Park, and that some Kaiparowits species may simply be the descendants of Dinosaur Park species. However, new dates reveal that this is simply an artifact of inaccurate Ar-Ar dating, and both formations had similar ages.

According to new Uranium-Lead stratigraphic data, the fossil-bearing portion of the Kaiparowits Formation dates from about 77.24 to 75.02 million years ago, with the volcaniclastic Upper Valley Member estimated to date from 73.8 to 72.8 million years ago.

== Biostratigraphy ==
The timeline below follows the re-calibrated timeline of Fowler (2017), showing species from the Kaiparowits Formation in green, and related species from Alberta in blue.

== Habitat ==
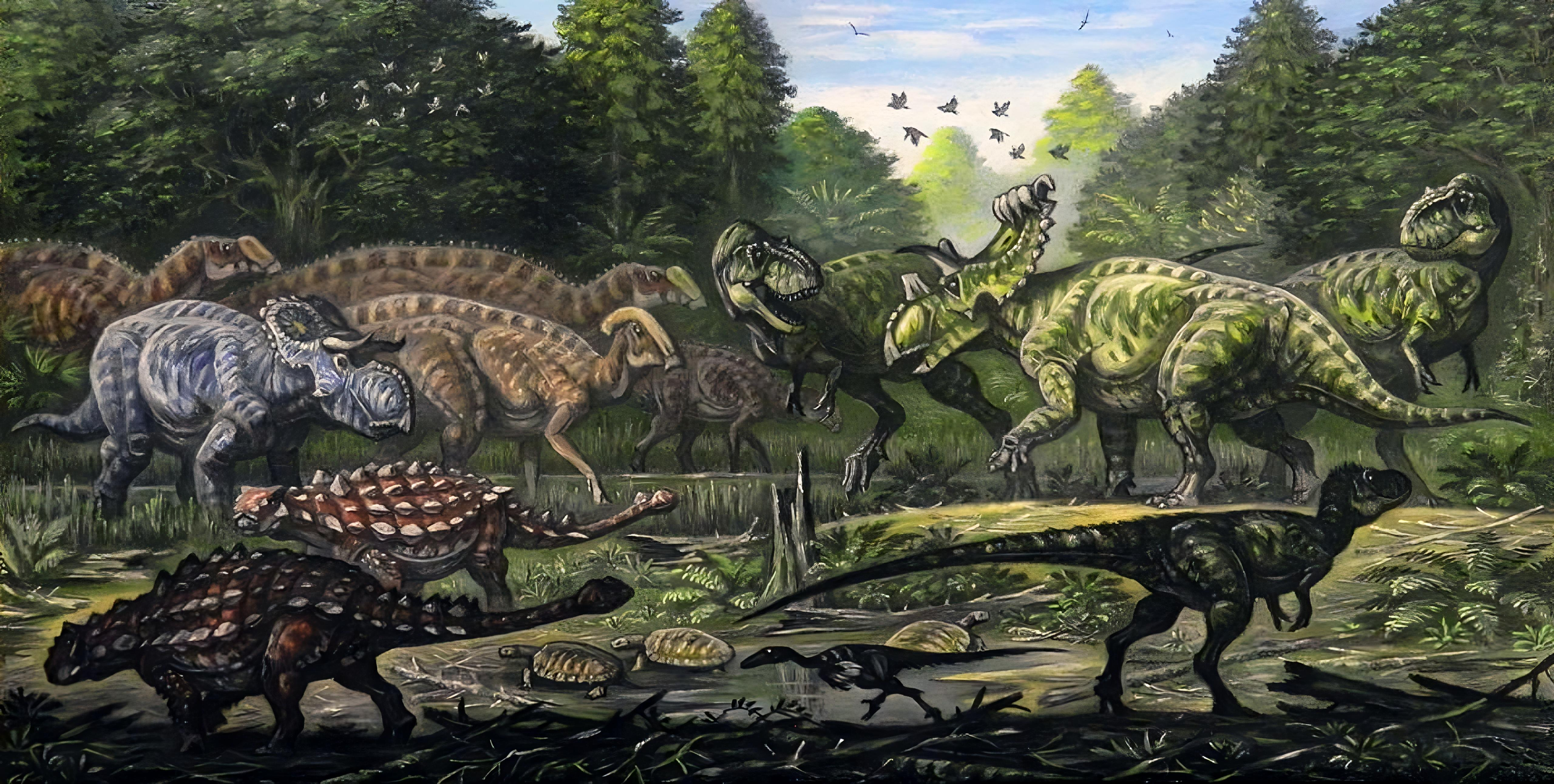
Dinosaurs of Kaiparowits Formation

The Kaiparowits Formation is a muddy bed that was deposited between about 77.3 to 72.8 million years ago, in the area where the Grand Staircase–Escalante National Monument of Utah is today. It is extremely fossil rich, with thousands of plants and animal fossils being preserved in amongst its sandstone and mudstone deposits. Based on plants remains including multiple vines, leaves, and branches, It was assumed by paleontologists Scott Sampson and his colleagues that Utah in the Campanian was a dense jungle bordering the Western Interior Seaway. The jungle theory would also support why almost all the animals in the Kaiparowits Formation were new species, and why the deposits were so plentiful. Without the need for herbivores to migrate to find food, and theropods to migrate after herbivores, a whole ecosystem could evolve secluded from interbreeding. The theory also supported why the dinosaurs adorned such features like the 15 horns of Kosmoceratops, they were for sexual selection.

== Paleofauna ==
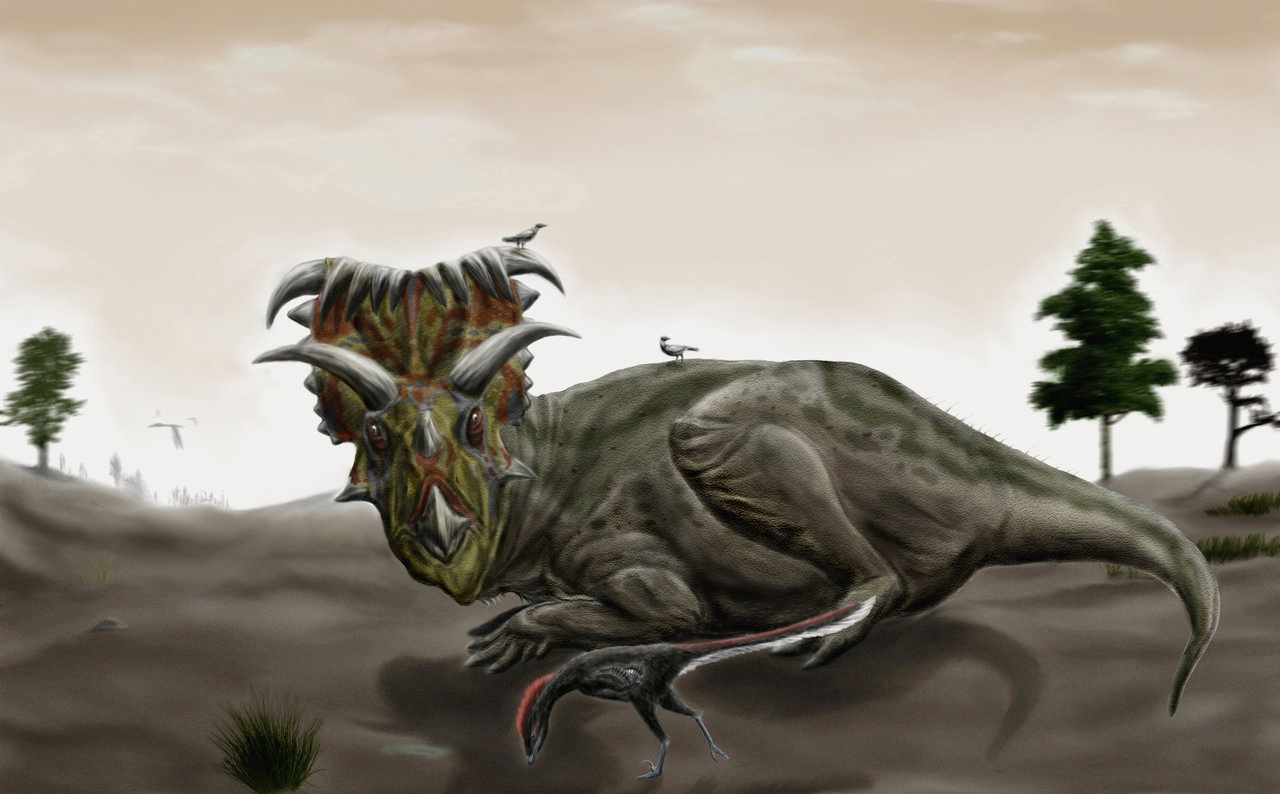
A Kosmoceratops disturbed from its rest by a wandering Talos in Laramidia

Animals present include chondrichthyans (sharks and rays), gars, bowfin, sturgeons, frogs, salamanders, turtles, lizards (including the monstersaurian Bolg amondol), crocodilians (including Deinosuchus), pterosaurs, coelurosaurian theropods such as dromaeosaurids, troodontids, and Ornithomimus velox, armored dinosaurs, the duckbill Parasaurolophus cyrtocristatus, and a variety of early mammals including multituberculates, marsupials, and insectivorans. Recent finds include large specimens of the duckbill Gryposaurus, including the species G. monumentensis, and the first described remains of the oviraptorosaurian Hagryphus giganteus.

Trace fossils are also known from the Kaiparowits, including an excellently preserved hadrosaur skin impression known from a recent analysis by Herrero and Farke.

=== Lizards ===
| Color key: Taxon / Reclassified taxon / Taxon falsely reported as present / Dubious taxon or junior synonym / Ichnotaxon / Ootaxon / Morphotaxon | Notes; Uncertain or tentative taxa are in small text; ~~crossed out~~ taxa are discredited. |

Lizards reported from the Kaiparowits Formation
| Genus | Species | Location | Stratigraphic position | Material | Notes | Images |
|---|---|---|---|---|---|---|
| Bolg | B. amondol | 'Fossil Ridge' Locality | | A fragmented skelton with articulated parts | A monstersaurian lizard | |
| Odaxosaurus | O. roosevelti | | | | A anguid lizard | |
| Parasaniwa | P. cynochoros | | | | A palaeovaranid anguimorph | |

=== Turtles ===
| Color key: Taxon / Reclassified taxon / Taxon falsely reported as present / Dubious taxon or junior synonym / Ichnotaxon / Ootaxon / Morphotaxon | Notes; Uncertain or tentative taxa are in small text; ~~crossed out~~ taxa are discredited. |

Turtles reported from the Kaiparowits Formation
| Genus | Species | Location | Stratigraphic position | Material | Notes | Images |
|---|---|---|---|---|---|---|
| Boremys | B. grandis | | | | A baenid | |
| Arvinachelys | A. goldeni | | | | A baenid, notable for its atypical nasal structure. | |
| Denazinemys | D. nodosoa | | middle unit of the upper Kaiparowits Formation | | A baenid | |
| Neurankylus | Two species | | | | A baenid | |
| Thescelus | int. | | | | A baenid | |
| Compsemys | C. victa | | | | A paracryptodiran | |
| Adocus | indet., possibly several species | | | | An adocid | |
| Basilemys | B. nobilis | | | | A possible member of Nanhsiungchelyidae. By far the largest native turtle at about 78 centimeters in length. | |
| Helopanoplia | indt. | | | | A softshell turtle | |

=== Neosuchians ===
| Color key: Taxon / Reclassified taxon / Taxon falsely reported as present / Dubious taxon or junior synonym / Ichnotaxon / Ootaxon / Morphotaxon | Notes; Uncertain or tentative taxa are in small text; ~~crossed out~~ taxa are discredited. |

Crocodilians reported from the Kaiparowits Formation
| Genus | Species | Location | Stratigraphic position | Material | Notes | Images |
|---|---|---|---|---|---|---|
| Bernissartia | B. sp | | | | May not be Bernissartia proper, but a close cousin. It would extend the family's time range to the Campanian. | Bernissartia Brachychampsa Deinosuchus |
| Alligatoroid | nov. gen. | | | | Is similar in form to Allognathosuchus. | Bernissartia Brachychampsa Deinosuchus |
| Brachychampsa | B. sp | | | | A new species yet to be described. Reached around 2 meters in length and is known from skull bones and a partial juvenile skeleton. | Bernissartia Brachychampsa Deinosuchus |
| Caimanine | nov. gen. | | | | Known from a lower jaw fragment. Is the oldest known true caiman found. | Bernissartia Brachychampsa Deinosuchus |
| Deinosuchus | D. hatcheri | | | | A very large alligatoroid, almost or over 10 meters in length. | Bernissartia Brachychampsa Deinosuchus |
| Deinosuchus | D. riograndensis | | | | A very large alligatoroid, similar in size to D. hatcheri. | Bernissartia Brachychampsa Deinosuchus |
| Goniopholid | nov. gen. | | | | A new genus that exceeded 3 meters in length. Has a thin snout suited for piscivory. | Bernissartia Brachychampsa Deinosuchus |
| Leidyosuchus | L. sp | | | | A new species known from a partial skeleton | Bernissartia Brachychampsa Deinosuchus |

=== Ornithischians ===
| Color key: Taxon / Reclassified taxon / Taxon falsely reported as present / Dubious taxon or junior synonym / Ichnotaxon / Ootaxon / Morphotaxon | Notes; Uncertain or tentative taxa are in small text; ~~crossed out~~ taxa are discredited. |

==== Ankylosaurs ====
Ankylosaurs reported from the Kaiparowits Formation
| Genus | Species | Location | Stratigraphic position | Material | Notes | Images |
|---|---|---|---|---|---|---|
| Akainacephalus | A. johnsoni | Horse Mountain Gryposaur Quarry | Lower middle unit | A complete skull, both mandibles, predentary, dorsal vertebrae, dorsosacral vertebrae, sacral vertebrae, caudosacral vertebrae, caudal vertebrae, dorsal ribs, a complete tail club, both scapulae, coracoid, humerus, ulna, partial ilium, femur, tibia, fibula, phalanx, partial cervical osteoderm half rings, and dorsal and lateral osteoderms. | A species of ankylosaurine related to Nodocephalosaurus. | Akainacephalus |
| Ankylosauridae | Indeterminate | | | A partial left mandible, a disarticulated forelimb consisting of a fused scapulocoracoid, humerus, radius, ulna, metacarpals, manual phalanx and an ungual, a scapula, coracoid, cervical vertebrae, caudal vertebrae, dorsal centra vertebrae, sacral vertebrae, chevrons, a complete cervical half ring, dorsal ribs, a partial tail club, numerous osteoderms and teeth. | An indeterminate ankylosaurid known from various partial specimens. | Akainacephalus |
| Anodontosaurus | sp. nov. | UMNH VP locality 1506 | Lower middle unit | An isolated partial skull lacking the left lateral-most portion and much of the anterodorsal and posteroventral palate. | Described in a thesis, different from the other two Anodontosaurus species. | Akainacephalus |
| Nodosauridae | Indeterminate | | Middle unit | A cervical spine, numerous osteoderms, and teeth. | Indeterminate nodosaurid remains. | Akainacephalus |

==== Ceratopsians ====
Ceratopsians reported from the Kaiparowits Formation
| Genus | Species | Location | Stratigraphic position | Material | Notes | Images |
|---|---|---|---|---|---|---|
| Centrosaurinae | Indeterminate | | Middle unit | A partial skull and an isolated right squamosal. | Also known as "Kaiparowits Centrosaurine B." Different from Nasutoceratops. | Kosmoceratops Nasutoceratops Utahceratops |
| Chasmosaurinae | Indeterminate | Dog Flat | Lower unit | Right side of an articulated partial skull, including the ventral lacrimal, jugal, epijugal, quadratojugal, postorbital, maxilla, squamosal, and rostrolateral parietal in the region of the supratemporal fenestra. | Might be a distinct taxon based on its episquamosal and squamosal morphology. | Kosmoceratops Nasutoceratops Utahceratops |
| Kosmoceratops | K. richardsoni | | Lower middle unit | A nearly complete skull and a disarticulated skull of a subadult individual. | A chasmosaurine ceratopsid with ten hook-like processes on the hind margin. | Kosmoceratops Nasutoceratops Utahceratops |
| Nasutoceratops | N. titusi | UMNH VP Locality 940 | Lower middle unit | An almost complete skull, a disarticulated adult skull, an isolated squamosal, a syncervical, fragmentary dorsal vertebrae, associated left forelimb and fragmentary right forelimb. | A centrosaurine ceratopsid with rounded horns above its eyes. | Kosmoceratops Nasutoceratops Utahceratops |
| Utahceratops | U. gettyi | | Lower to middle unit | [Two] partially complete skulls, a partial postorbital consisting of the nearly complete supraorbital horncore, an isolated rostrum, premaxilla, nasal fragment, jugal, squamosal and parietal, an associated post cranium, and two immature specimens consisting of partial postorbitals with complete supraorbital horncores. | A chasmosaurine ceratopsid known from adult and juvenile specimens. | Kosmoceratops Nasutoceratops Utahceratops |

==== Ornithopods ====
Hadrosaurs reported from the Kaiparowits Formation
| Genus | Species | Location | Stratigraphic position | Material | Notes | Images |
|---|---|---|---|---|---|---|
| Brachylophosaurini | Indeterminate | | Lower unit | An isolated jugal. | The youngest example of brachylophosaurin material from Laramidia. | Gryposaurus Parasaurolophus "Skaladromeus" |
| Gryposaurus | G. monumentensis | | Middle unit | A mostly complete skull, a partial subadult skull, a partial skull roof and partial braincase, a partially articulated skeleton consisting of a portion of the skull and lower jaws, most of the dorsal, sacral, and caudal vertebral series, fragmentary ribs, scapulae, coracoid, humerus, and the entire pelvis, and a partial skeleton consisting of dorsal, sacral, and caudal vertebral series, a number of ribs, scapula, humerus, radius, ulna, and a complete pelvis. | A kritosaurin saurolophine hadrosaur. Gryposaurus is the most common hadrosaur found in this formation. | Gryposaurus Parasaurolophus "Skaladromeus" |
| Gryposaurus | G. sp. | | Lower unit | Several specimens including a virtually complete articulated skull and a fragmentary skull. | May be referable to G. notabilis as the only difference is size and stratigraphy, the Kaiparowits specimens being much larger and more recent. | Gryposaurus Parasaurolophus "Skaladromeus" |
| Hadrosaurinae | Indeterminate | | Lower unit | An articulated tail, partial pelvis, and left leg. | An indeterminate hadrosaurine, initially interpreted as a lambeosaurine. | Gryposaurus Parasaurolophus "Skaladromeus" |
| Lambeosaurinae | Indeterminate | | | Two partial skeletons | Similar to Hypacrosaurus altispinus; different from Parasaurolophus | Gryposaurus Parasaurolophus "Skaladromeus" |
| Ornithopoda | Indeterminate | | | [Six] disarticulated specimens and [one] articulated specimens, including articulated left and right feet from a single individual. | One specimen shares similar foot morphology with Orodromeus, Oryctodromeus and Zephyrosaurus. | Gryposaurus Parasaurolophus "Skaladromeus" |
| Parasaurolophus | P. cyrtocristatus | | Lower to middle unit | [Eight] isolated partial skulls, a partial skeleton consisting of mostly the pelvic region, fragmentary associated elements, and a juvenile specimen consisting of a partial skull and articulated skeleton. | Originally identified as P. cyrtocristatus, then believed to be a new species, then tentatively referred back to P. cyrtocristatus. | Gryposaurus Parasaurolophus "Skaladromeus" |
| "Skaladromeus" | "S. goldenii" | | Lower to middle unit | A partial disarticulated skull and fragmentary postcranial material. | An orodromine ornithopod described in a thesis. | Gryposaurus Parasaurolophus "Skaladromeus" |

=== Theropods ===
| Color key: Taxon / Reclassified taxon / Taxon falsely reported as present / Dubious taxon or junior synonym / Ichnotaxon / Ootaxon / Morphotaxon | Notes; Uncertain or tentative taxa are in small text; ~~crossed out~~ taxa are discredited. |

Theropods reported from the Kaiparowits Formation
| Genus | Species | Location | Stratigraphic position | Material | Notes | Images |
|---|---|---|---|---|---|---|
| cf. Dromaeosaurus | Indeterminate | | | Isolated teeth | A dromaeosaurine dromaeosaurid only represented by isolated teeth. | Dromaeosaurus Hagryphus Mirarce Saurornitholestes Talos sampsoni Teratophoneus curriei |
| Dromaeosauridae | Indeterminate | | | An isolated pedal phalanx PII-I and isolated unguals. | Indeterminate dromaeosaurid remains. | Dromaeosaurus Hagryphus Mirarce Saurornitholestes Talos sampsoni Teratophoneus curriei |
| Hagryphus | H. giganteus | "The Blues" | Middle of middle unit | Fragmentary distal left radius, complete left carpus including the semilunate and radiale, and left manus with complete digit I and III, complete digit II, fragmentary distal metatarsals and pedal phalanges, and articulated distal portion of pedal digit II. | A caenagnathine caenagnathid, closely related to Chirostenotes. | Dromaeosaurus Hagryphus Mirarce Saurornitholestes Talos sampsoni Teratophoneus curriei |
| Mirarce | M. eatoni | UCMP locality V93097 | | Cervical vertebrae, thoracic vertebrae, pygostyle, phalanges, a complete humerus, femur, tarsometatarsus, a partial scapula, coracoid, furcula, tibiotarsus, and fragments of the sternum, radius, ulna, carpometacarpus, and manual phalanges. | An avisaurid enantiornithine represented by an adult specimen. | Dromaeosaurus Hagryphus Mirarce Saurornitholestes Talos sampsoni Teratophoneus curriei |
| Ornithomimidae | Indeterminate | | Middle unit | [Three] partial pelvises, [five] tibiae, partial axial column, caudal vertebrae, carpus, antebrachium, femora, partial metatarsals, an incomplete manus, incomplete sets of phalanges, incomplete dorsal ribs, partially damaged cranial material, a nearly complete hind limb, a partial foot, and an isolated articulated foot with an associated limb bone. | Probably not referable to Ornithomimus. Closely related to "Ornithomimus" sedens and Rativates. | Dromaeosaurus Hagryphus Mirarce Saurornitholestes Talos sampsoni Teratophoneus curriei |
| cf. Saurornitholestes | Indeterminate | | | Isolated teeth | A saurornitholestine or velociraptorine dromaeosaurid represented by isolated teeth. | Dromaeosaurus Hagryphus Mirarce Saurornitholestes Talos sampsoni Teratophoneus curriei |
| Stillatuberoolithus | S. storrsi | | | Two partial eggs and 29 fragments. | A bird or small non-avian theropod. | Dromaeosaurus Hagryphus Mirarce Saurornitholestes Talos sampsoni Teratophoneus curriei |
| Talos | T. sampsoni | "The Blues" | Middle of middle unit | Dorsal vertebrae, sacral vertebrae, caudal vertebrae, ulna, additional forelimb fragments, a partial pelvis, and partial left and right hind limbs. | A troodontid known from a subadult specimen. | Dromaeosaurus Hagryphus Mirarce Saurornitholestes Talos sampsoni Teratophoneus curriei |
| Teratophoneus | T. curriei | "The Blues"; UMNH VP Locality 597 | Middle unit | A lacrimal, jugal, frontal, squamosal, otoccipital and proötic, otoccipital, basisphenoid, quadrates, jugal, maxilla, dentary, articular, cervical vertebra, scapula, coracoid, humerus, ulna, femur and a subadult specimen consisting of a maxilla, lacrimals, postorbitals, squamosal, quadratojugal, quadrate, frontals, parietals, braincase, ectopterygoids, epipterygoid, pterygoids, angulars, surangulars, prearticular, articular, atlas, postaxial cervical vertebrae, cervical ribs, dorsal vertebrae, dorsal ribs, sacral vertebrae, caudal vertebrae, chevrons, portions of ilia, pubes, ischia, complete femur, tibia, fibula, pedal phalanx, and ungual. | A tyrannosaurine tyrannosaurid known from immature specimens. It was the largest carnivore in the area, as well as the most common tyrannosaur in the area. | Dromaeosaurus Hagryphus Mirarce Saurornitholestes Talos sampsoni Teratophoneus curriei |
| Troodontidae | Indeterminate | | | An isolated frontal, isolated caudal vertebra, a proximal tibia, fragmentary metatarsals, pedal phalanges, and pedal unguals, in addition to fragmentary cranial remains, including the basioccipital, fused parietals, portions of both squamosals, and isolated teeth. | Indeterminate troodontid remains. | Dromaeosaurus Hagryphus Mirarce Saurornitholestes Talos sampsoni Teratophoneus curriei |
| Tyrannosauridae | Indeterminate | | | Multiple adult specimens consisting of femora, tibiae, fibula, a complete astragalus and calcaneum, two metatarsal III, complete pedal PIII-1 and PIII-2, pedal phalanxes, pedal unguals, caudal vertebrae, isolated fused parietals, a partial dentary, an isolated humerus, an isolated lacrimal, an isolated jugal and a juvenile specimen consisting of fused parietals, a partial unfused frontal, and partial dentary. | Indeterminate tyrannosaurid remains. | Dromaeosaurus Hagryphus Mirarce Saurornitholestes Talos sampsoni Teratophoneus curriei |

== See also ==
- List of dinosaur-bearing rock formations
