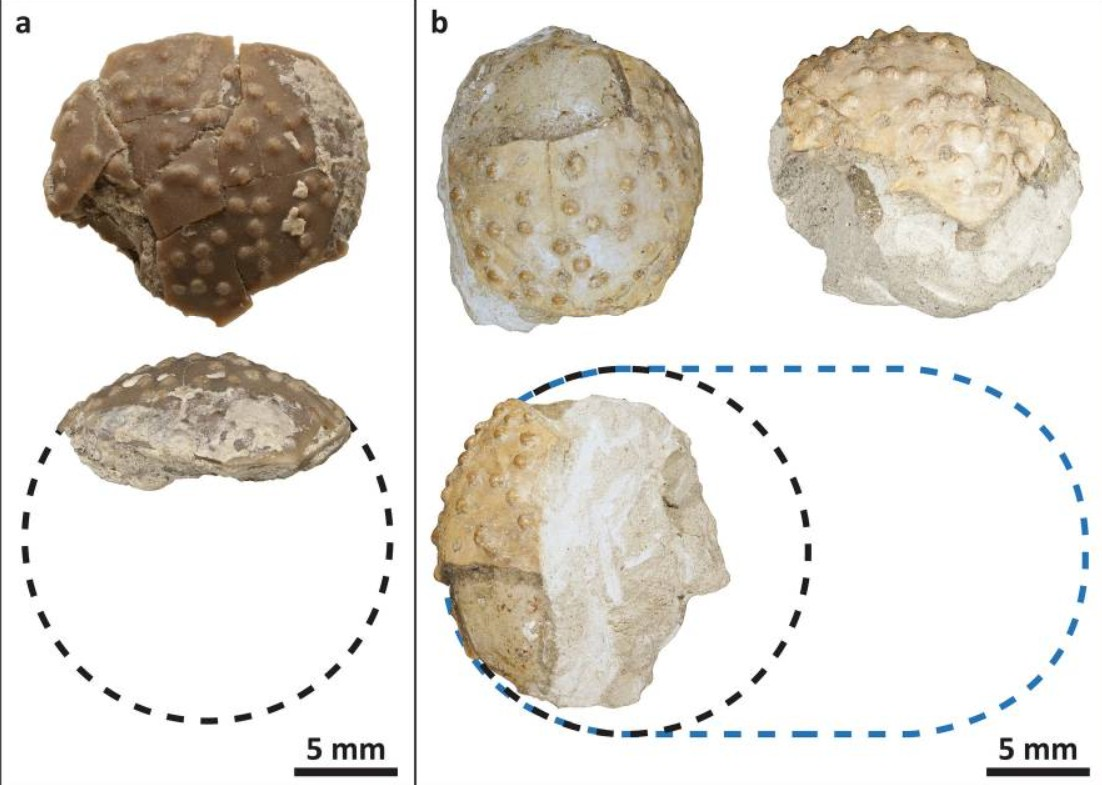
- Type and paratype specimens of Stillatuberoolithus, with reconstructed outline.

Egg fossil classification
- Oofamily: incertae sedis
- Oogenus: †Stillatuberoolithus; Oser et al. 2021

Oospecies
- S. storrsi Oser et al. 2021 (type)

= Stillatuberoolithus =

Stillatuberoolithus Temporal range: Campanian

Dinosaur egg

Stillatuberoolithus is an oogenus of very small theropod eggs (possibly from a bird) from the Upper Cretaceous (Campanian) of Utah. It contains a single oospecies, S. storrsi.

== Description ==
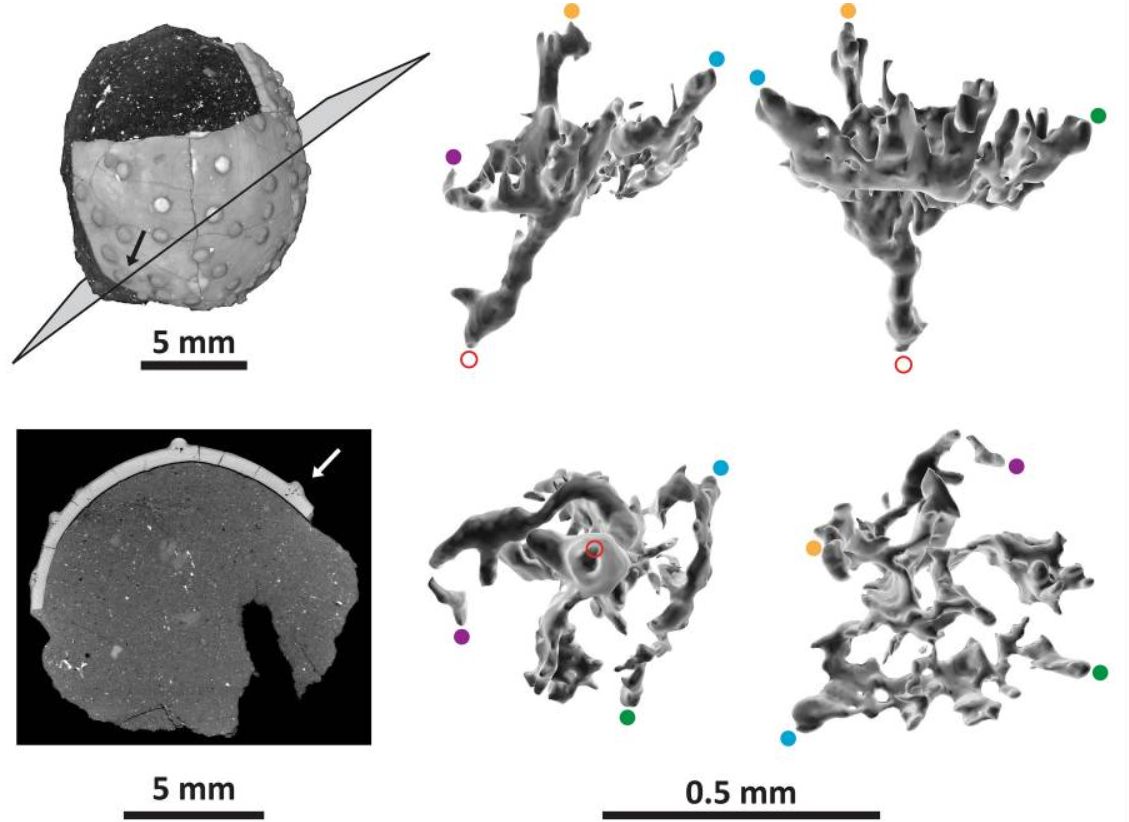
Three-dimensional CT scan of one pore canal of Stillatuberoolithus, showing the complex branching structure.

Since no complete eggs are known, the overall size and shape of Stillatuberoolithus is uncertain. The shape of two partial eggs appears spherical, but could be from the pole of an ellipsoidal egg. Reconstructing them as spherical, they would have a diameter of 17.7 millimetres (0.70 in), which would make them the smallest known Mesozoic dinosaur egg. (By comparison, other contendors include an unnamed bird egg from Mongolia measuring 20.80 by 15.88 millimetres (0.819 in × 0.625 in) or the ovaloolithid Minioolithus measuring 29.93 by 22.92 millimetres (1.178 in × 0.902 in).) The overall size and appearance is similar to that of some fossil anguimorph eggs, but the microscopic structure is distinct.

The eggshell is 0.31–0.40 millimetres (0.012–0.016 in) thick, excluding ornamentation. The outer surface is covered with relatively large circular or oval nodes (dispersituberculate ornamentation). These nodes are relatively thick, adding up to 0.19 millimetres (0.0075 in) to the shell thickness overall. The shell has two distinct layers of calcite, which is typical for theropod eggs. In Stillatuberoolithus, the mammary layer (the inner of the two layers) is 10-50% thicker than the continuous layer (the outer layer), and the two layers are divided by an abrupt boundary. The mammary layer is characterized by tabular ultrastructure, while the continuous layer shows horizontal accresion lines when viewed in cross-section. The nodes are crystallographically disjointed from the rest of the eggshell, thus resembling the eggs of emus but contrasting with eggs of maniraptorans despite their similar external appearance.

As in all amniotic animals' eggs, the shell has pores so that the embryo could breathe. In Stillatuberoolithus, these pores are small (0.03–0.04 millimetres (0.0012–0.0016 in) in diameter) and open externally on the shell's nodes, similar to Laevisoolithids, Pseudogeckoolithus, and Dimorphoolithus. The pore canals form complex three-dimensional, interconnected shapes within each node.

== Classification ==
Since the known specimens of Stillatuberoolithus are not associated with embryos or nesting parents, their parentage is unknown. Based on their size and microstructure, they are assumed to be the eggs of small birds or non-avian theropods, but there is not enough information to narrow the parentage down further (dinosaur and early bird eggs show a considerable degree of overlap in structure). A cladisitc analysis by Wu et al. (2024) found Stillatuberoolithus to be closer related to eggs of nonavian dinosaurs (more specifically, eggs of therizinosaurs, Torvosaurus, and the ootaxa Arriagadoolithus, Dendroolithus, and Triprismatoolithus) than to birds.

Stillatuberoolithus shows the closest similarity to the Indian oospecies Subtiliolithus kachchhensis, and also shares similarity to Porituberoolithus and Pseudogeckoolithus. Before it was named, Stillatuberoolithus was classified in the oofamily Laevisoolithidae. However, further analysis showed it most likely should be distinguished from laevisoolithids, but also cast doubt on the current accepted classification of that oofamily.

== Discovery and naming ==
The Grand Staircase-Escalante National Monument was established in Utah in 1996. Since that time, the site has yielded abundant fossils including many eggshell remains. The American paleontologist Sara E. Oser, of the University of Colorado's Museum of Natural History, made several of these eggs the focus of the research for her master's thesis in 2018. In 2021, she and a team of other paleontologists based the new oogenus and oospecies Stillatuberoolithus storrsi on the basis of two partial eggs and 29 shell fragments. The generic name is derived from the Latin words for "drip" and "bump", referring to the distinctive bumpy ornamentation of the eggshell, and "oolithes", the conventional suffix for oogenus names. The oospecific epithet refers to Dr. Glenn Storrs, a paleontologist working for the Cincinnati Museum of Natural History. The same eggs were also one of the subjects of a 2020 study by Choi et al. on the different modes of development of dispersituberculate ornamentation.

== Distribution and paleoecology ==
The confirmed specimens of Stillatuberoolithus are all from the Kaiparowitz Formation in southern Utah, from a site dated radiometrically to between 76.46 and 74.69 million years ago， during the Campanian. This area was a floodplain west of the Western Interior Seaway. This formation is believed to represent an ancient wetland. The formation has yielded a diverse assemblage of aquatic and terrestrial plant and animal fossils. Among the known animals from the Kaiparowitz Formation are many small theropods and enantiornithine birds, possible parents of Stillatuberoolithus.

Some eggshells possibly referrable to Stillatuberoolithus have been reported from the Fruitland Formation in New Mexico, the Aguja Formation of Texas, and the Dinosaur Park Formation of Alberta.
