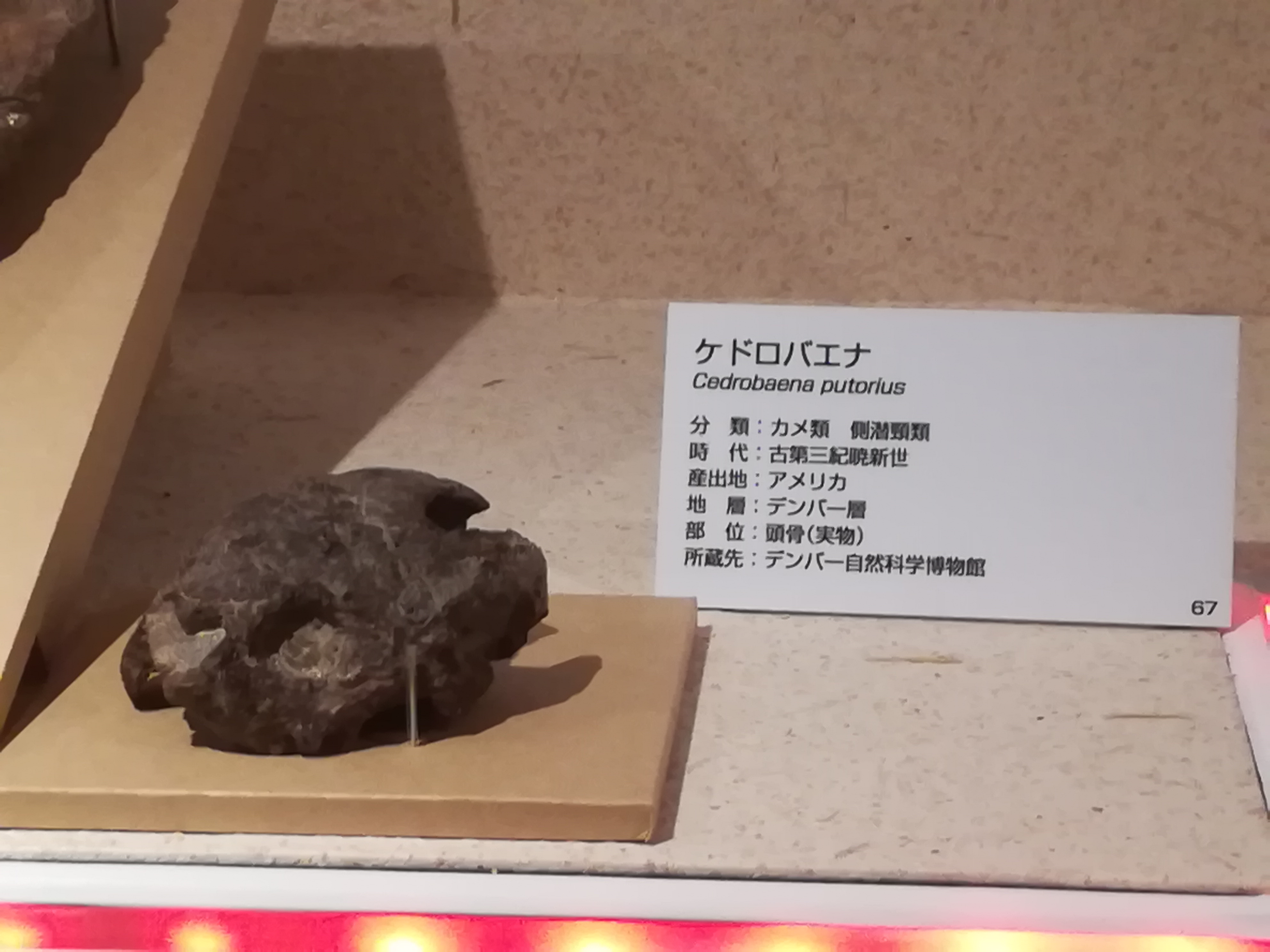
- Cedrobaena putorius in National Museum of Nature and Science

Scientific classification
- Domain: Eukaryota
- Kingdom: Animalia
- Phylum: Chordata
- Class: Reptilia
- Clade: Pantestudines
- Clade: Testudinata
- Clade: †Paracryptodira
- Family: †Baenidae
- Genus: †Cedrobaena; Lyson & Joyce, 2009

Type species
- Cedrobaena putorius Gaffney, 1972

Synonyms
- Plesiobaena putorius

= Cedrobaena =

Cedrobaena Temporal range: Late Cretaceous-Paleocene 63.3–56.8 Ma

Extinct genus of turtles

Cedrobaena is an extinct genus of turtle which existed in the Tiffanian Cedar Point Quarry, Wyoming and in the latest Maastrichtian Hell Creek Formation, United States. It was first named by Tyler R. Lyson and Walter G. Joyce in 2009 and the type species is Cedrobaena putorius.
