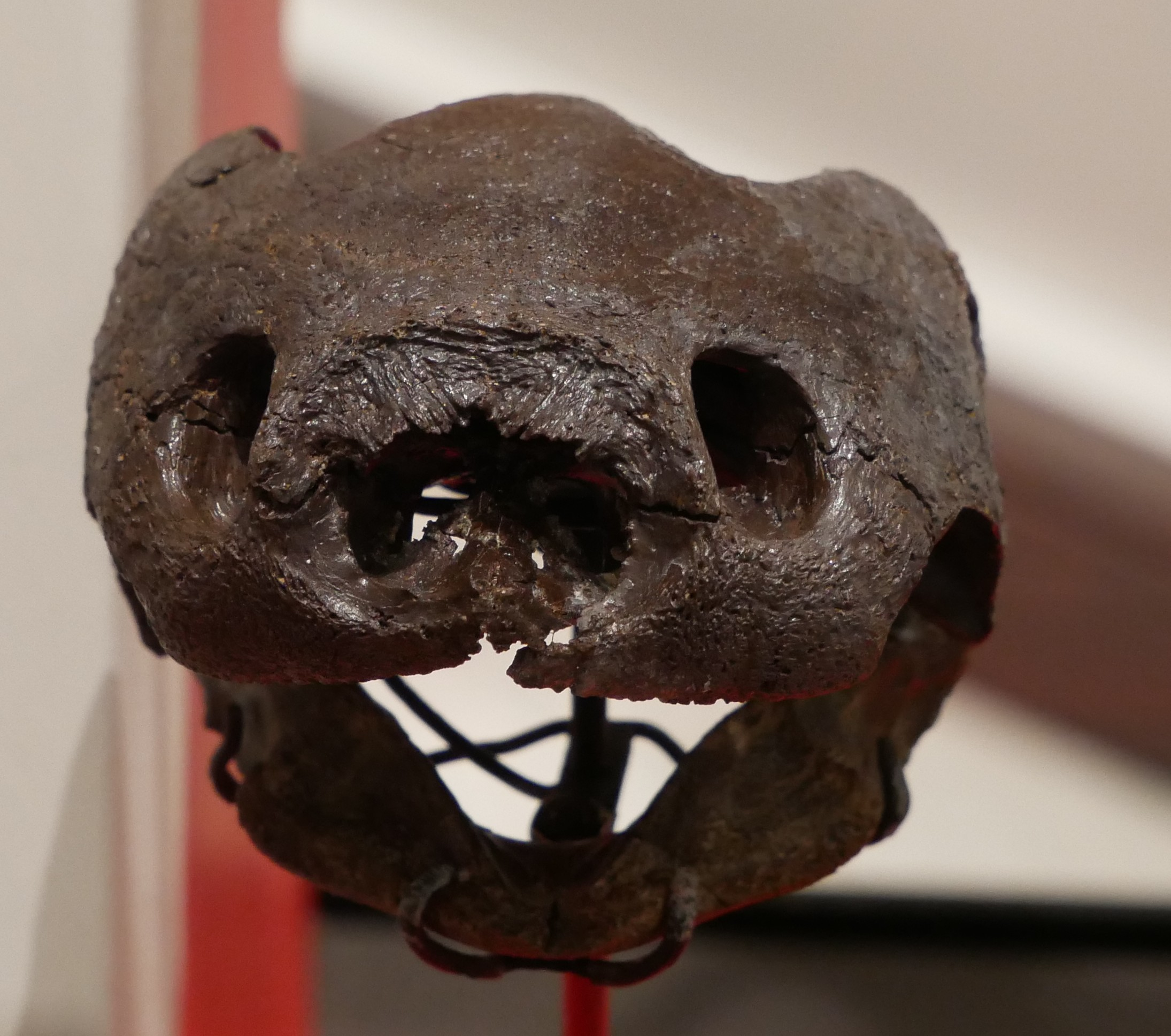
- P. cohen skull at the Yale Peabody Museum

Scientific classification
- Kingdom: Animalia
- Phylum: Chordata
- Class: Reptilia
- Clade: Pantestudines
- Clade: Testudinata
- Clade: †Paracryptodira
- Family: †Baenidae
- Genus: †Palatobaena; Gaffney, 1972

Species
- P. bairdi Gaffney, 1972 (type); P. cohen Lyson & Joyce, 2009; P. gaffneyi Archibald & Hutchison, 1979; P. knellerorum Lyson et al., 2021

= Palatobaena =

Palatobaena Temporal range: Late Cretaceous-Early Eocene 70.6–50.3 Ma

Extinct genus of turtles

Palatobaena is an extinct genus of baenid turtle. It was first named by Gaffney in 1972 and the type species is Palatobaena bairdi. It based on a fragmentary skull from the Fort Union Formation of the Bighorn Basin of Wyoming. The two other species are P. gaffneyi (a complete skull from Eocene (Wasatchian North American Land Mammal Age)) and P. cohen which existed in Hell Creek Formation, North Dakota during the late Cretaceous period (Maastrichtian age).
