= Peckemys =

Peckemys Temporal range: Late Cretaceous

Scientific classification
- Domain: Eukaryota
- Kingdom: Animalia
- Phylum: Chordata
- Class: Reptilia
- Clade: Pantestudines
- Clade: Testudinata
- Clade: †Paracryptodira
- Family: †Baenidae
- Genus: †Peckemys; Lyson and Joyce, 2009

Type species
- Peckemys brinkman Lyson and Joyce, 2009

Extinct genus of turtles

Peckemys is an extinct genus of baenid turtle which existed in the Hell Creek Formation, United States during the late Cretaceous period (Maastrichtian age). It was first named by Tyler R. Lyson and Walter G. Joyce in 2009 and the type species is Peckemys brinkman.
