= Pseudogeckoolithus =

Pseudogeckoolithus Temporal range: Maastrichtian

Egg fossil classification
- Basic shell type: †Dinosauroid-prismatic
- Oogenus: †Pseudogeckoolithus; Vianey-Liaud and López-Martínez, 1997

Oospecies
- P. nodosus; ?P. tirbouliensis

Dinosaur egg

Pseudogeckoolithus is an oogenus of dinosaur egg. It is known from several fragments of eggshells. The outer surface of these are covered with little knobs and nodes. Some of the pores in the eggshell open through these nodes, similar to modern geckos, but unique among the dinosauroid-prismatic group of eggs. However, the microstructure of Pseudogeckoolithus shows that it is not actually of the geckoid type. It is possible that these eggs represent a new basic group of fossil eggs.
