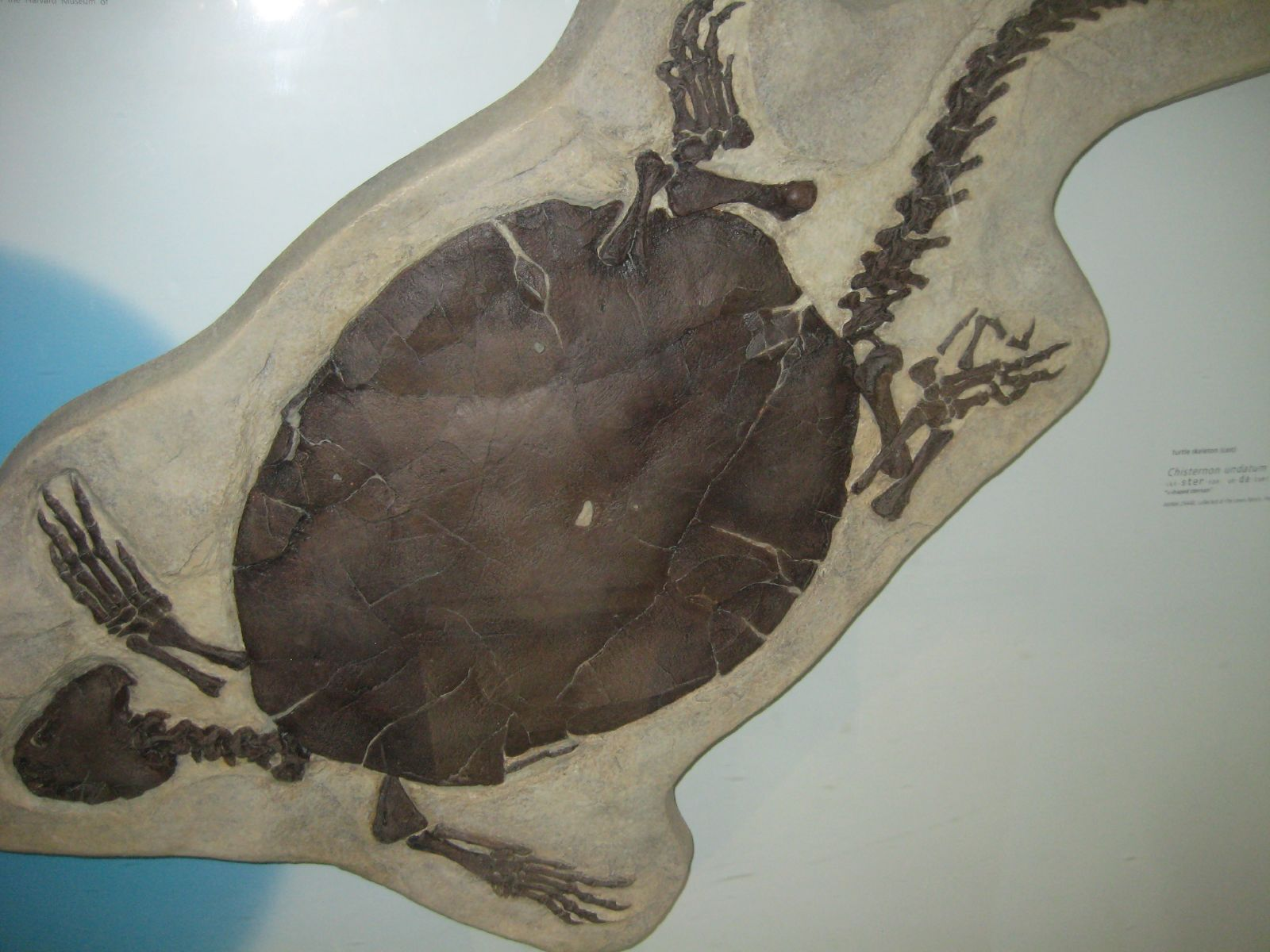
- Chisternon, AMNH
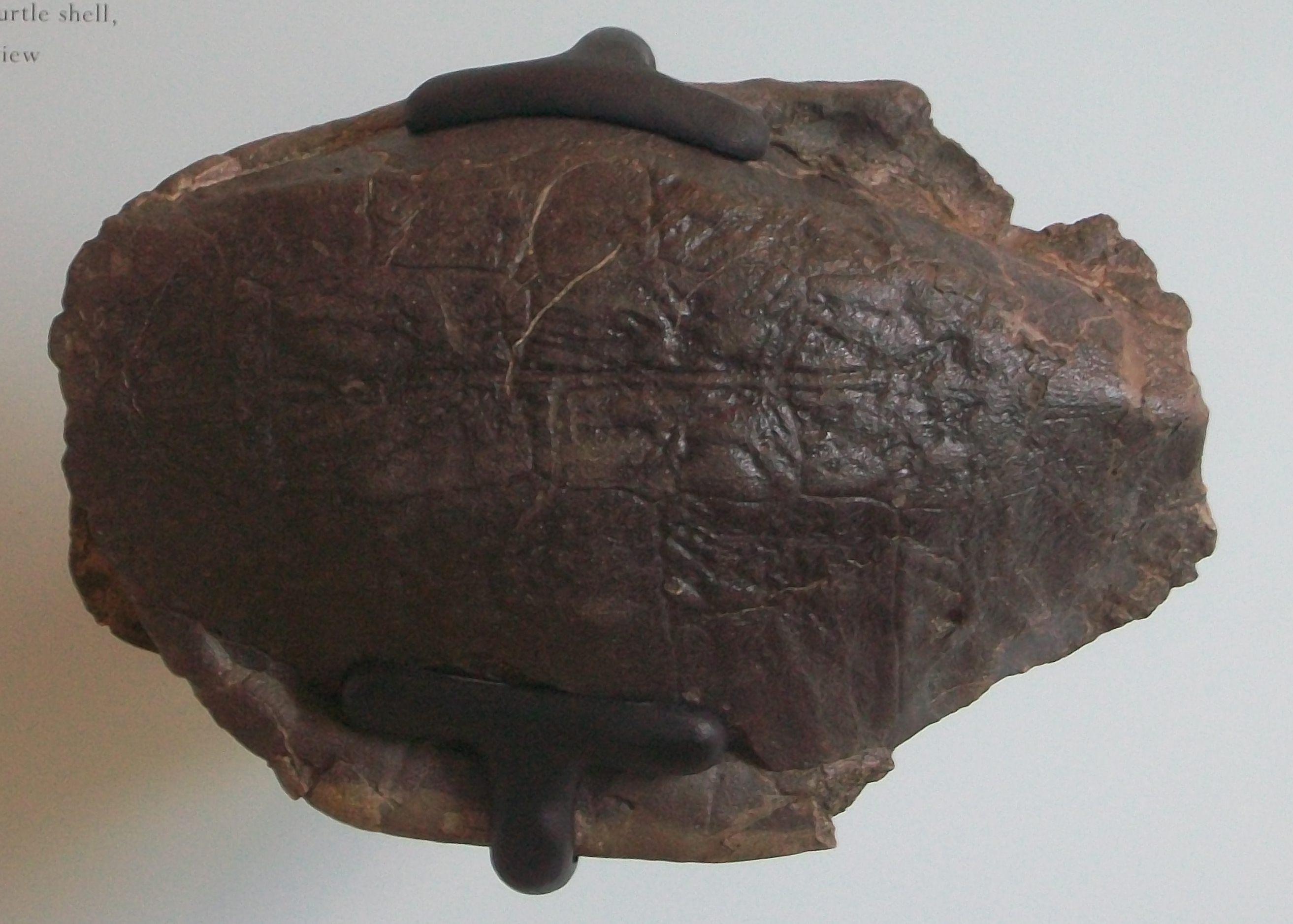
- Shellof Baena arenosa (AMNH 1112)

Scientific classification
- Kingdom: Animalia
- Phylum: Chordata
- Class: Reptilia
- Clade: Pantestudines
- Clade: Testudinata
- Clade: †Paracryptodira
- Superfamily: †Baenoidea
- Family: †Baenidae; Cope, 1882

= Baenidae =

Baenids Temporal range: (Valanginian to Eocene, 139.4–40 Ma

Extinct family of turtles

Baenidae is an extinct family of paracryptodiran turtles known from the Early Cretaceous to the Eocene of North America. The name of the type genus, Baena, appears to be of Native American origin, likely from the Arapaho be’enoo. They are primarily found in freshwater deposits, and are considered to be aquatic, with a largely generalist habit.

== Evolutionary history ==
During the Early Cretaceous they were found across North America however by the Late Cretaceous they are only found in Laramidia having disappeared from Appalachia. Most lineages survived the K-Pg Extinction, but the family was extinct by the latest Eocene.

== Taxonomy ==
=== Genera ===
This family contains numerous genes. A list of them can be found below:

- †Arundelemys
- †Arvinachelys
- †Baena
- †Cedrobaena
- †Chisternon
- †Edowa
- †Gamerabaena
- †Gehennachelys
- †Hayemys
- †Lakotemys Lakota Formation, Berriasian-Valanginian
- †Neurankylus
- †Palatobaena
- †Peckemys
- †Plesiobaena
- †Protobaena
- †Denazinemys
- †Saxochelys
- †Stygiochelys
- †Thescelus
- †Trinitichelys

=== Phylogeny ===
The following cladogram shows the taxonomy and phylogeny of baenids according to Joyce & Lyson (2015).

- Baenidae Cope, 1873
  - Arundelemys dardeni Lipka et al., 2006
  - Trinitichelys hiatti Gaffney, 1972
  - - Neurankylus Lambe, 1902
      - Neurankylus lithographicus Larson et al., 2013
      - Neurankylus baueri Gilmore, 1916
      - Neurankylus eximius Lambe, 1902
      - Neurankylus sp.
    - - Protobaena wyomingensis (Gilmore, 1920)
      - - Hayemys latifrons (Hay, 1908)
        - - Thescelus Hay, 1908
            - Thescelus insiliens Hay, 1908
            - Thescelus rapiens Hay, 1908
          - Baenodda Brinkman, 2003
            - Arvinachelys goldeni
            - Scabremys ornata (Gilmore, 1935)
            - - Eubaeninae Gaffney, 1972
                - Baena arenosa Leidy, 1870
                - - - Stygiochelys estesi Gaffney & Hiatt, 1971
                    - Chisternon undatum (Leidy, 1871)
                  - - "Baena" affinis Leidy, 1871
                    - - - "Baena" escavada Hay, 1908
                        - "Baena" hayi (Gilmore, 1916)
                      - - Eubaena hatcheri (Hay, 1901)
                        - - Eubaena cephalica (Hay, 1904)
                          - Denazinemys nodosa (Gilmore, 1916)
                          - Boremys Lambe, 1906
                            - Boremys grandis Gilmore, 1935
                            - Boremys pulchra (Lambe, 1906)
              - Palatobaeninae Gaffney, 1972
                - Plesiobaena antiqua (Lambe, 1902)
                - - Gamerabaena sonsalla Lyson & Joyce, 2010
                  - - Cedrobaena Lyson & Joyce, 2009
                      - Cedrobaena brinkman (Lyson & Joyce, 2009)
                      - Cedrobaena putorius (Gaffney, 1972)
                    - - Goleremys mckennai Hutchison, 2004
                      - Palatobaena Gaffney, 1972
                        - Palatobaena cohen Lyson & Joyce, 2009
                        - - Palatobaena bairdi Gaffney, 1972
                          - Palatobaena gaffneyi Archibald & Hutchison, 1979
