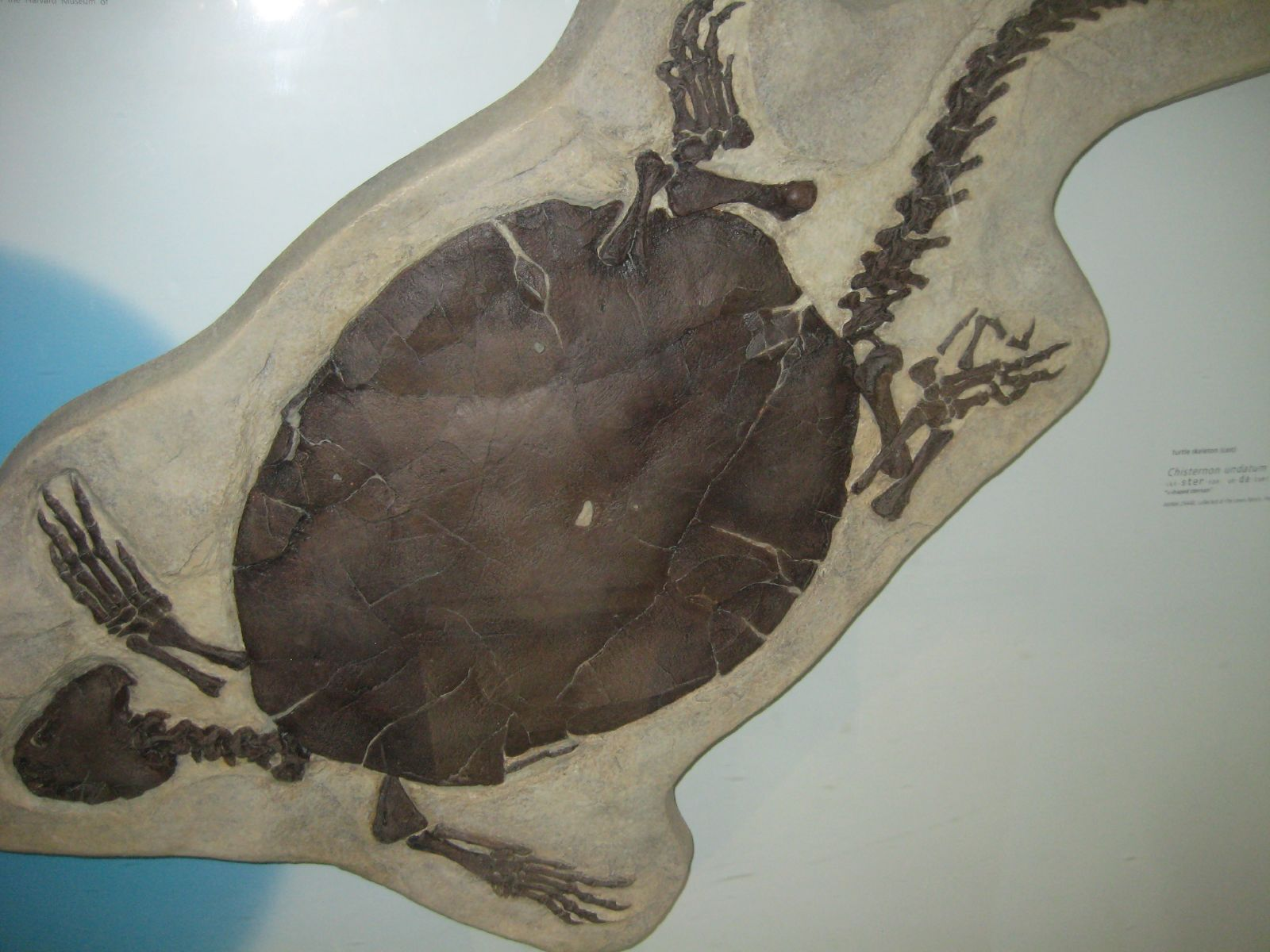
- Chisternon undatum, American Museum of Natural History

Scientific classification
- Domain: Eukaryota
- Kingdom: Animalia
- Phylum: Chordata
- Class: Reptilia
- Clade: Pantestudines
- Clade: Testudinata
- Clade: †Paracryptodira
- Family: †Baenidae
- Genus: †Chisternon; Leidy, 1872

= Chisternon =

Chisternon Temporal range: Eocene

Extinct genus of turtles

Chisternon is a genus of baenid turtles from the Eocene of North America.
