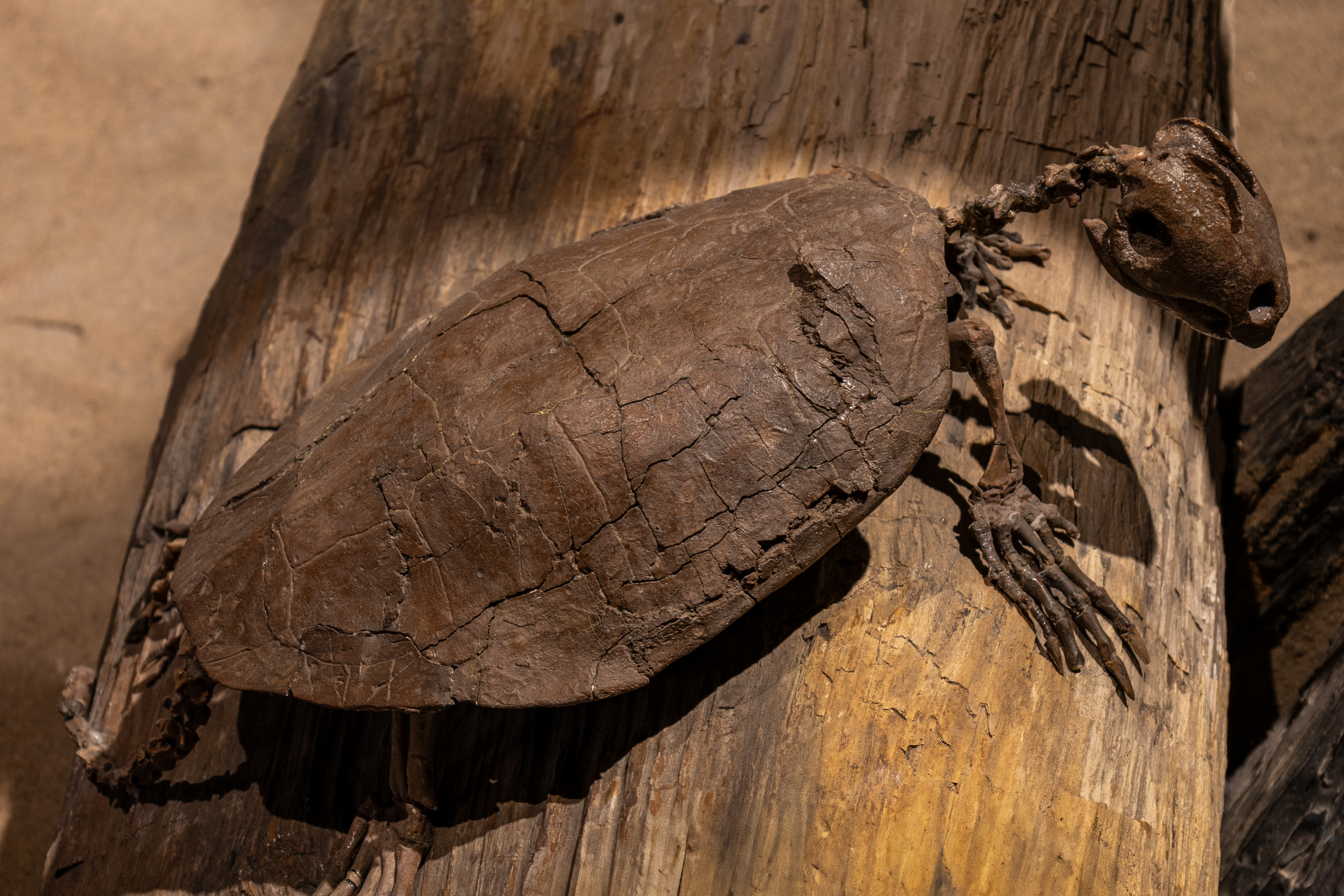
- Reconstructed skeleton of P. antiqua, Royal Tyrrell Museum of Palaeontology

Scientific classification
- Kingdom: Animalia
- Phylum: Chordata
- Class: Reptilia
- Clade: Pantestudines
- Clade: Testudinata
- Clade: †Paracryptodira
- Family: †Baenidae
- Genus: †Plesiobaena; Lambe, 1902

Type species
- †Plesiobaena antiqua Lambe, 1902

= Plesiobaena =

Plesiobaena Temporal range: Late Cretaceous, Campanian

Extinct turtle genus

Plesiobaena is an extinct genus of turtle which existed in the Belly River Formation, Canada during the late Cretaceous period (Campanian age). It was first described by Lawrence Lambe in 1902, and the type species is Plesiobaena antiqua.

P. antiqua cranium
(TMP 1994.12.273)

P. antiqua mandible
(TMP 1992.40.33)
