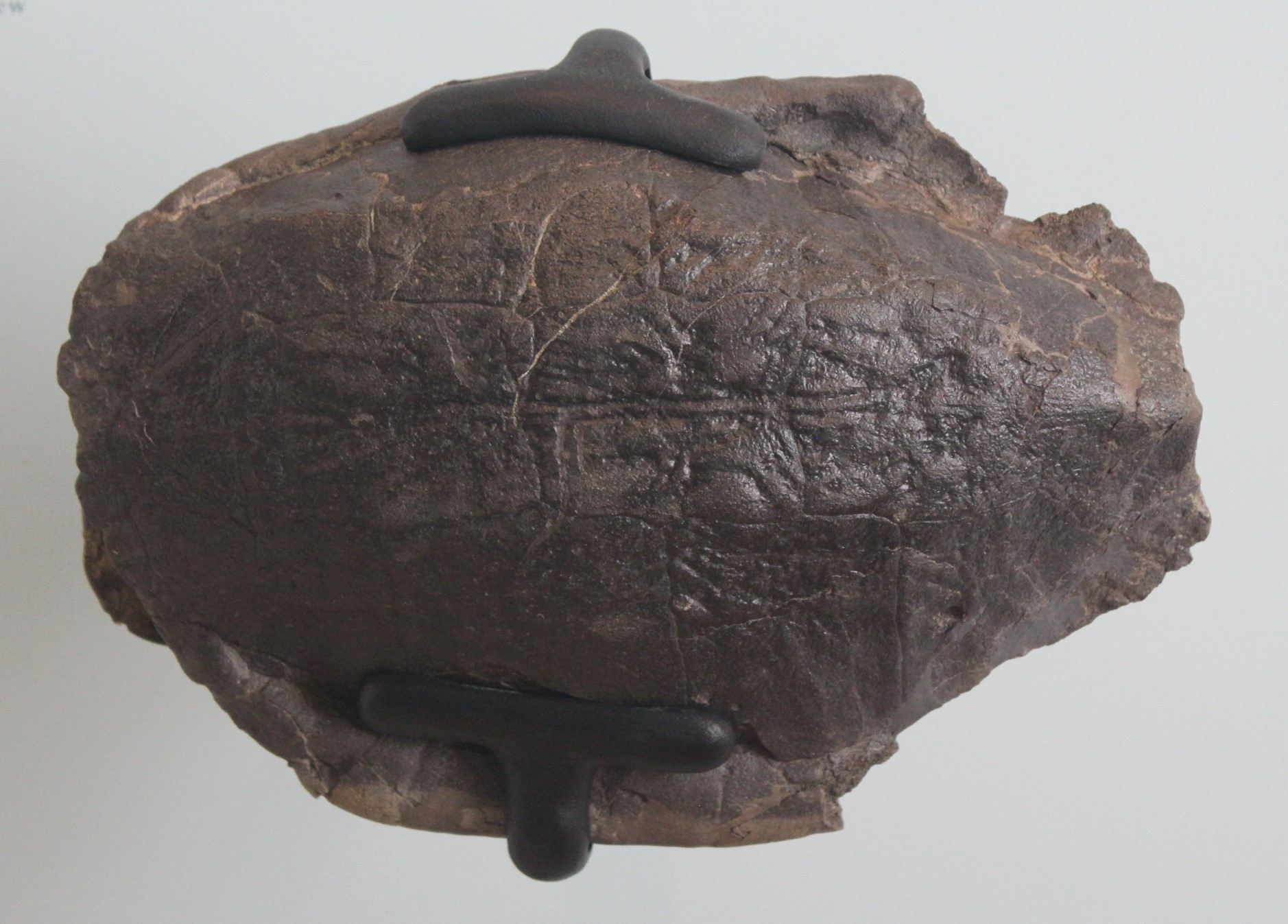
- Shell of B. arenosa (specimen AMNH 1112)

Scientific classification
- Domain: Eukaryota
- Kingdom: Animalia
- Phylum: Chordata
- Class: Reptilia
- Clade: Pantestudines
- Clade: Testudinata
- Clade: †Paracryptodira
- Family: †Baenidae
- Clade: †Baenodda
- (unranked): †Eubaeninae
- Genus: †Baena; Leidy, 1870

Type species
- †Baena arenosa Leidy, 1870

Species
- †Baena affinis Leidy, 1871; †Baena arenosa Leidy, 1870; †Baena escavada Hay, 1909; †Baena hayi Gilmore, 1916; †Baena marshi Hay, 1904

= Baena (turtle) =

Baena Temporal range: Late Cretaceous-Eocene, 70–40 Ma

Extinct genus of turtles

Baena (pronounced ba-en-na) is an extinct genus of baenid turtles that inhabited North America during the Late Cretaceous and early Paleogene. The genus name is thought to originate from a Native American language, possibly the Arapaho word for turtle, be’enoo.

Fossils of Baena have been found in locations including Kirtland Formation, Campanian New Mexico (B. sp.) (Cretaceous) and Ravenscrag Formation, Maastrichtian Canada (B. sp.) (Cretaceous).
