= Boremys =

Boremys Temporal range: Late Cretaceous, Campanian–Puercan

Scientific classification
- Kingdom: Animalia
- Phylum: Chordata
- Class: Reptilia
- Clade: Pantestudines
- Clade: Testudinata
- Clade: †Paracryptodira
- Family: †Baenidae
- (unranked): †Eubaeninae
- Genus: †Boremys; Lambe, 1906b

Type species
- †Baena pulchra Lambe, 1906a

Species
- Boremys pulchra (Lambe, 1906a); Boremys grandis Gilmore, 1935

Synonyms
- Baena pulchra Lambe, 1906a; Boremys albertensis Gilmore, 1920

Extinct genus of baenid turtle

Boremys is an extinct genus of baenid turtle from the Late Cretaceous and early Paleocene of North America.

== Naming and description ==
It is known from two species, the first being B. pulchra named in 1906 by Lawrence M. Lambe for a partial plastron and carapace from the Campanian Dinosaur Park Formation of Alberta as a species of the extinct turtle Baena, before being reassigned to the new genus Boremys later that year. The second valid species is B. grandis, named in 1935 by Charles W. Gilmore for a near complete shell from the Campanian Kirtland Formation of New Mexico. A third species, B. albertensis, was named by Gilmore in 1920 but is now recognized as a junior synonym of B. pulchra. Additional material of an uncertain species of Boremys, from the Hell Creek Formation of Montana and the Fort Union Formation of Texas, show that Boremys survived the K-T Extinction and lived at least into the early Paleocene.
