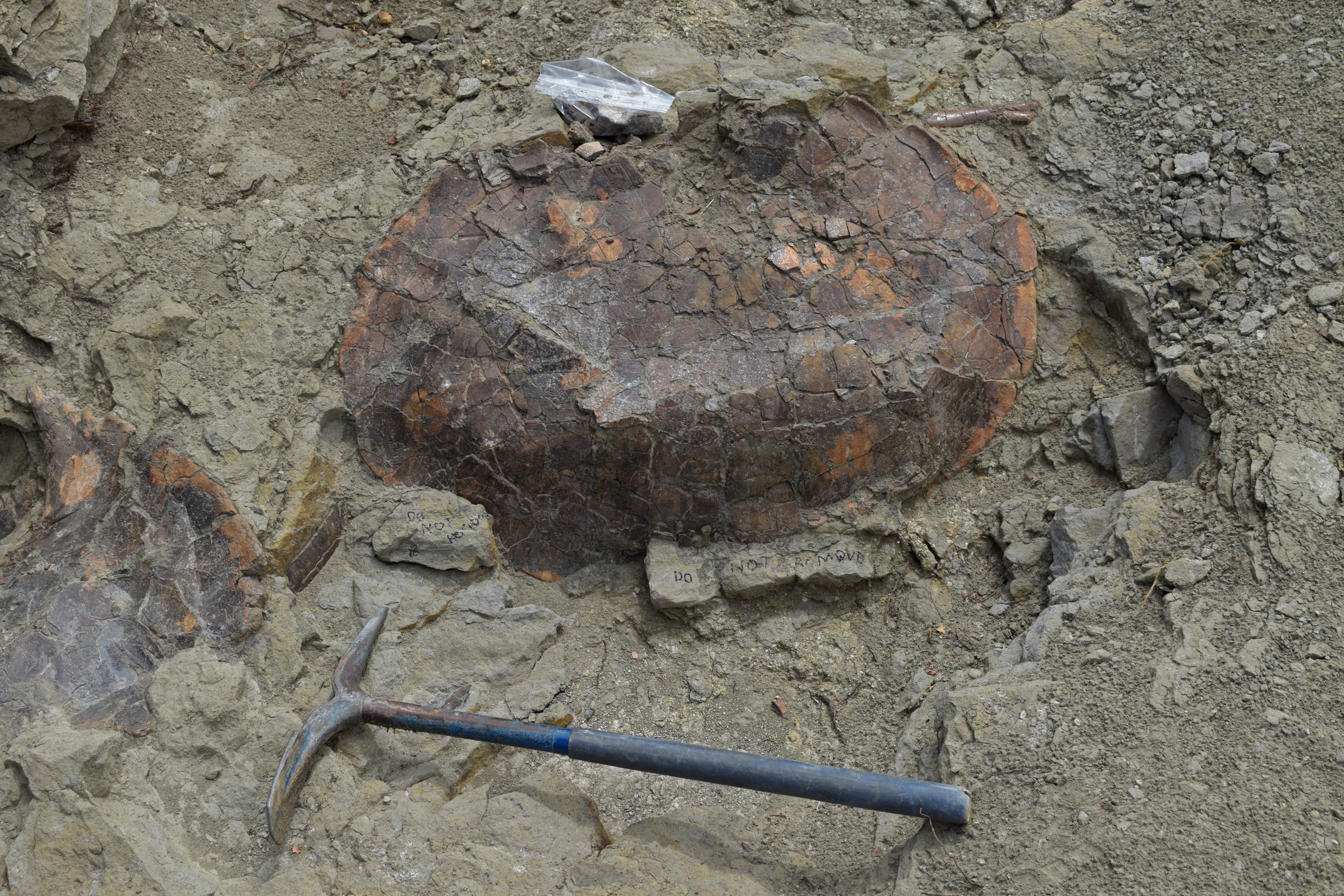
- Shells of N. utahensis during excavation

Scientific classification
- Domain: Eukaryota
- Kingdom: Animalia
- Phylum: Chordata
- Class: Reptilia
- Clade: Pantestudines
- Clade: Testudinata
- Clade: †Paracryptodira
- Family: †Baenidae
- Genus: †Neurankylus; Lambe in Osborn & Lambe, 1902

Type species
- †Neurankylus eximius Lambe, 1902

Species
- †N. baueri Gilmore, 1916; †N. eximius Lambe, 1902; †N. hutchinsoni Lively, 2016; †N. lithographicus Larson et al., 2013; †N. notos Lichtig & Lucas, 2016; †N. torrejonensis Lyson et al., 2016

Synonyms
- Charitemys Hay, 1908

= Neurankylus =

Neurankylus Temporal range: Early Cretaceous-Paleocene, 112–61 Ma

Extinct genus of turtles

Neurankylus is an extinct genus of turtles in the family Baenidae that lived between 112 and 61 million years ago in Canada and the United States. It was originally placed within the monotypic family Neurankylidae, but it has since been placed in the Neurankylinae, alongside Trinitichelys. The type species, Neurankylus eximius, was described by Lawrence Lambe in 1902. The species N. lithographicus was discovered in the Milk River Formation (Canada), alongside the holotype of the pachycephalosaurid dinosaur Acrotholus audeti.
