= Solemys =

Solemys Temporal range: Late Cretaceous Campanian–Maastrichtian

Scientific classification
- Kingdom: Animalia
- Phylum: Chordata
- Class: Reptilia
- Clade: Pantestudines
- Clade: Testudinata
- Family: †Helochelydridae
- Genus: †Solemys de Lapparent de Broin and Murelaga 1996

Type species
- Solemys gaudryi Matheron, 1869

Extinct genus of turtles

Solemys is an extinct genus of helyochelydrid stem-turtle known from the Late Cretaceous (late Campanian-early Maastrichtian) of southern France and eastern Spain.

== Taxonomy ==
Two species are known, the type species Solemys gaudryi (Matheron, 1869) and S. vermiculata de Lapparent de Broin and Murelaga, 1996. The former was originally assigned to the Cenozoic turtle genus Apholidemys by Matheron (1869), but de Lapparent de Broin and Murelaga (1996) recognized it as a stem turtle distinct from Apholidemys and renamed it Solemys.

The following cladogram displays the phylogenetic relationships of Solemys according to Tong et al. 2023:

- - Mesochelydia
    - †Kayentachelys
    - - †Condrochelys
      - - - †Heckerochelys
          - - †Eilanchelys
            - †Indochelys
        - Perichelydia
          - †Spoochelys
          - - †Meiolaniformes
            - - †Sichuanchelyidae
              - - †Helochelydridae
                  - †Aragochersis
                  - - †Solemys
                      - †Solemys gaudryi
                      - †Solemys vermiculata
                    - - †Helochelydra
                      - †Naomichelys
                - Testudines (crown group)
                  - - †Paracryptodira
                      - †Haemys
                      - †Baenidae
                      - - †Neurankylus
                        - - - †Dinochelys
                            - †Glyptops
                          - - - †Arundelemys
                              - †Trinitichelys
                            - - †Uluops
                              - - †Lakotemys
                                - †Pechemys
                            - - †Toremys
                              - - †Dorsetochelys
                                - †Pleurosternon
                    - - †Compsemydidae
                      - - †Platychelyidae
                        - Pleurodira (side-necked turtles)
                  - - - †Solnhofia
                      - - †Santanachelys
                        - †Thalassochelydia
                    - - - †Macrobaenidae
                        - †Xinjiangchelyidae
                      - crown-group Cryptodira
                        - - Testudinoidea (pond turtles, tortoises, etc)
                          - - Chelydroidea (snapping turtles)
                            - Panchelonioidea (sea turtles)
                        - - †Siamochelys
                          - - †Sinaspideretes
                            - - †Basilochelys
                              - †Nanhsiungchelys
                              - - †Basilemys
                                - - †Adocus
                                  - - †Shachemys
                                    - Trionychia (soft-shelled and pig-nosed turtles)
