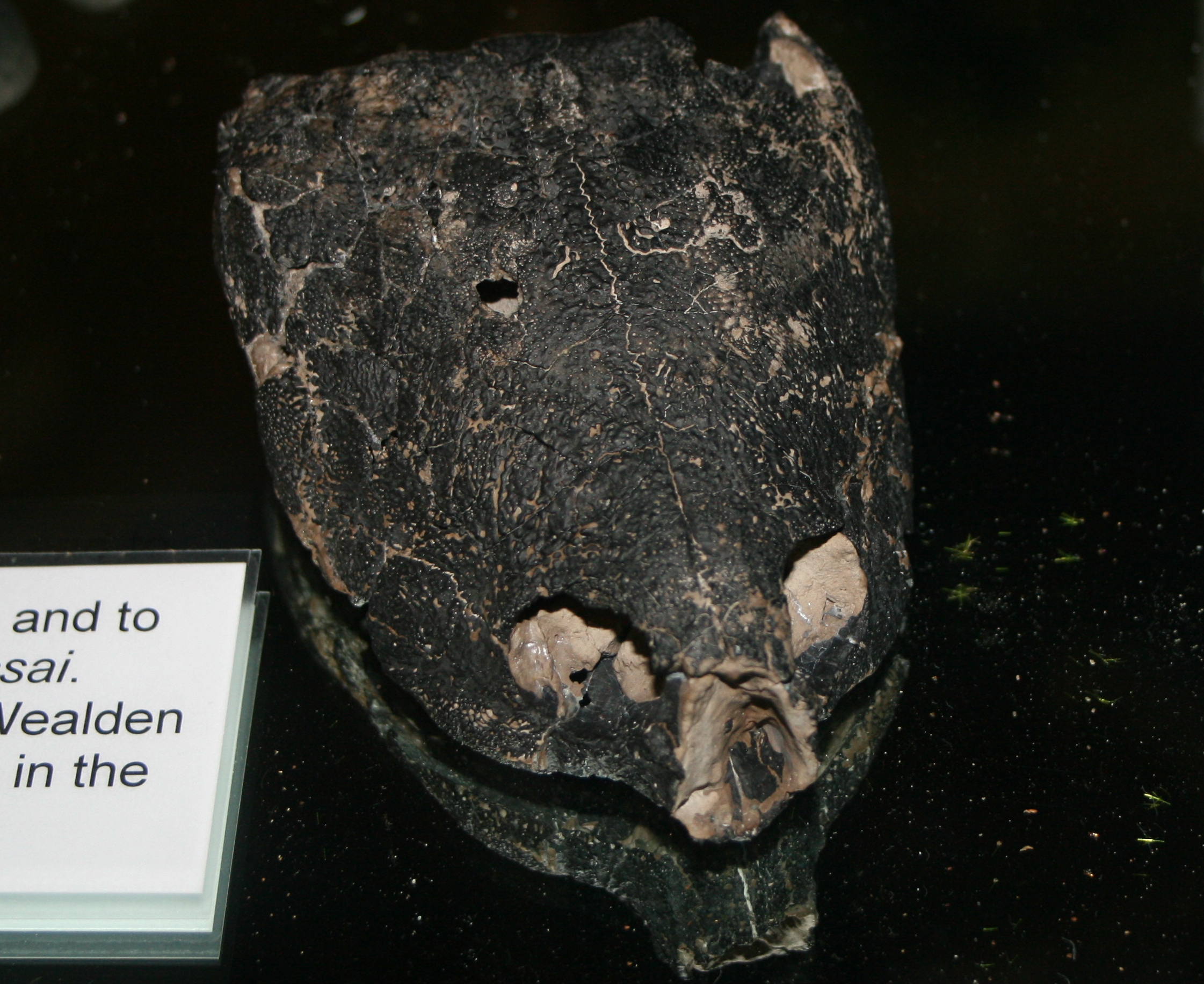
- Helochelydra nopcsai skull
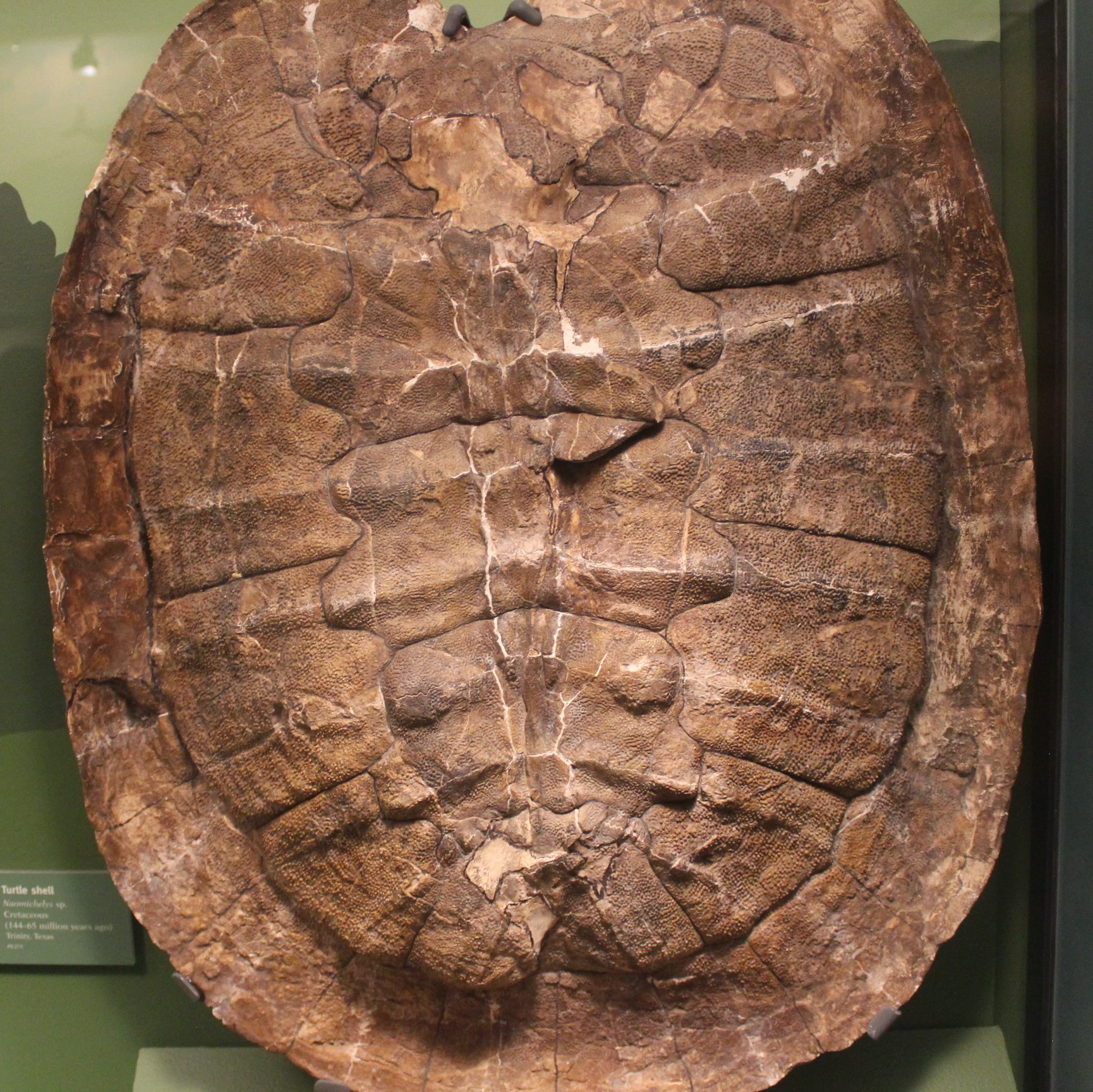
- Shell of Naomichelys

Scientific classification
- Kingdom: Animalia
- Phylum: Chordata
- Class: Reptilia
- Clade: Pantestudines
- Clade: Testudinata
- Clade: Perichelydia
- Family: †Helochelydridae; Nopsca, 1928

Genera
- See text

Synonyms
- Solemydidae Lapparent and Murelaga 1997

= Helochelydridae =

Helochelydridae Temporal range: Berriasian–Maastrichtian

Extinct family of reptiles

The Helochelydridae are an extinct family of stem-turtles known from fossils found in North America and Europe spanning the Early to Late Cretaceous.

== Description ==
The skull, shell and osteoderms of helochelydrids are covered in small, cylindrical protuberances, which are a distinctive characteristic of the group. They are thought to be terrestrial, based on the presence of limb osteoderms (granicones) and bone histology. Their skull morphology is dissimilar to that of extant tortoises, suggesting an omnivorous habit similar to that of box turtles.

== Taxonomy ==
Helochelydridae includes all turtles that are more closely related to Helochelydra than Sichuanchelys, Meiolania, or extant turtles. Although referred to as Solemydidae in recent literature on extinct turtles, Helochelydridae has priority over Solemydidae. They are placed as part of the clade Perichelydia. Some recent studies have recovered them as paracryptodires, though other studies have found them to be more basal than paracryptodires.

Position of helochelydrids according to Tong et al. 2023:

- - Mesochelydia
    - †Kayentachelys
    - - †Condrochelys
      - - - †Heckerochelys
          - - †Eilanchelys
            - †Indochelys
        - Perichelydia
          - †Spoochelys
          - - †Meiolaniformes
            - - †Sichuanchelyidae
              - - †Helochelydridae
                  - †Aragochersis
                  - - †Solemys
                    - - †Helochelydra
                      - †Naomichelys
                - Testudines (crown group)
                  - - †Paracryptodira
                      - †Haemys
                      - †Baenidae
                      - - †Neurankylus
                        - - - †Dinochelys
                            - †Glyptops
                          - - - †Arundelemys
                              - †Trinitichelys
                            - - †Uluops
                              - - †Lakotemys
                                - †Pechemys
                            - - †Toremys
                              - - †Dorsetochelys
                                - †Pleurosternon
                    - - †Compsemydidae
                      - - †Platychelyidae
                        - Pleurodira (side-necked turtles)
                  - - - †Solnhofia
                      - - †Santanachelys
                        - †Thalassochelydia
                    - - - †Macrobaenidae
                        - †Xinjiangchelyidae
                      - crown-group Cryptodira

== Genera ==
- Aragochersis Escucha Formation, Spain, Early Cretaceous (Albian)
- Helochelydra Wessex Formation, England, Early Cretaceous (Barremian)
- "Helochelydra" anglica (Lydekker, 1889) Purbeck Group, United Kingdom, (Berriasian)
- "Helochelydra" bakewelli Mantell, 1833 Tunbridge Wells Sandstone, England, (Valanginian)
- Helochelys Grünsandstein Formation, Germany, Late Cretaceous (Cenomanian), Cambridge Greensand, England, Albian-Cenomanian, France, Spain, Cenomanian
- Trachydermochelys phlyctaenus Seeley 1869 (revised Joyce, 2022), Cambridge Greensand, England, Albian-Cenomanian
- Naomichelys Cretaceous (Aptian-Campanian) North America
- Plastremys Upper Greensand Formation, Cambridge Greensand, England, Albian-Cenomanian, Spain, Albian France, Cenomanian
- Solemys France, Spain, Late Cretaceous (Campanian-Maastrichtian)
- Trachyaspis turbulensis Bergounioux 1957 Gargallo, Spain, Early Cretaceous (Aptian-Albian) (possibly synonymous with Plastremys rutteri)

Indeterminate remains most similar to "Helochelydra" anglica and "Helochelydra" bakewelli have been reported from the Berriasian aged Angeac-Charente bonebed of France.
