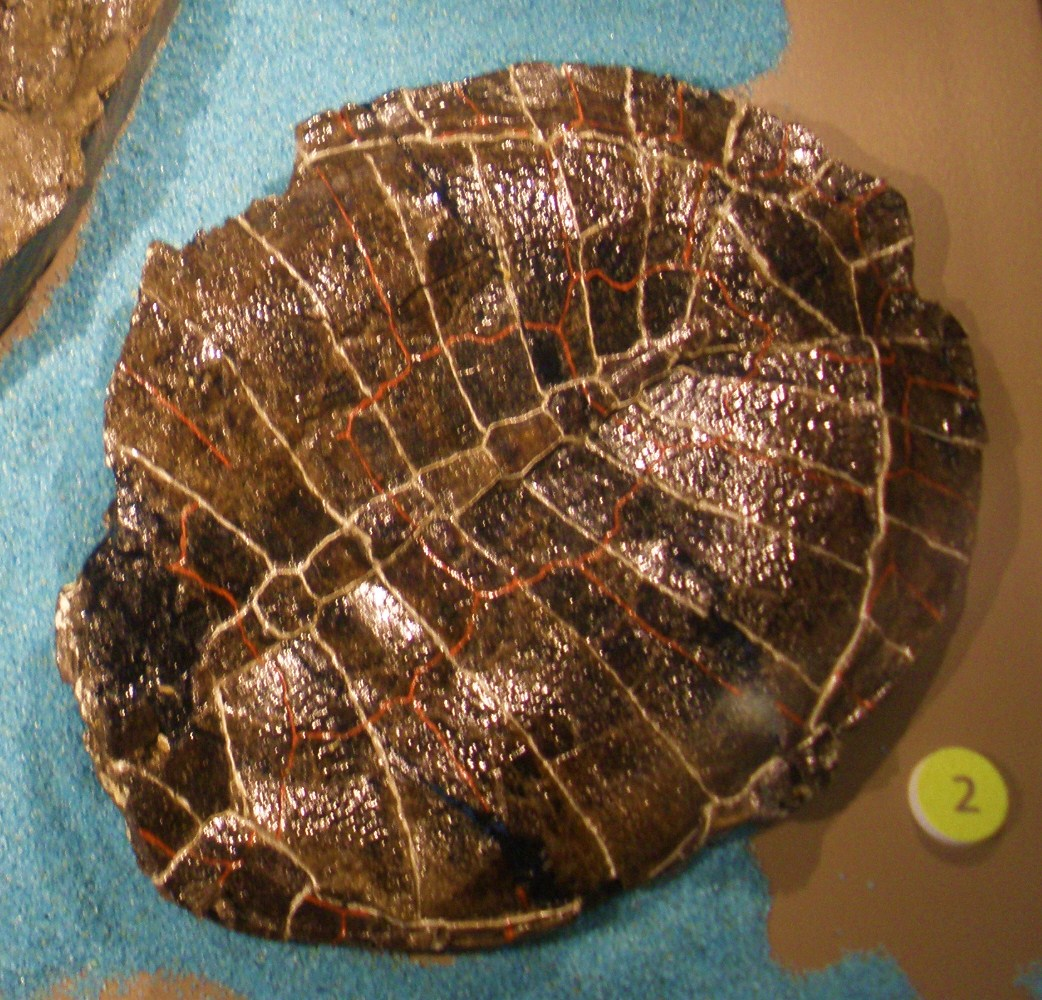
- Fossil of Peltochelys duchastelii

Scientific classification
- Kingdom: Animalia
- Phylum: Chordata
- Class: Reptilia
- Clade: Pantestudines
- Clade: Testudinata
- Clade: †Paracryptodira
- Family: †Compsemydidae; Pérez-García et al., 2015

Genera
- See text

= Compsemydidae =

Compsemydidae Temporal range: Berriasian–Thanetian Possible Late Jurassic records

Extinct family of turtles

Compsemydidae is an extinct family of turtles, likely belonging to the clade Paracryptodira. The earliest undisputed member is Tongemys from the Berriasian age of the Early Cretaceous; two Late Jurassic genera (Riodevemys and Selenemys) have also sometimes been included in the group, but may alternatively be members of the family Pleurosternidae. The genus Compsemys survived the Cretaceous–Paleogene extinction event and lasted until the Thanetian age of the Paleocene.

== Taxonomy ==
Compsemydidae was named in a 2015 paper by Pérez-García et al., who included the type genus Compsemys and its possible synonym Berruchelus. A 2020 paper by Joyce and Rollot expanded the family to include the enigmatic Peltochelys from the Early Cretaceous, as well as the Late Jurassic Riodevemys and Selenemys that had earlier been placed in Pleurosternidae. A 2021 paper by Rollot et al. added the Late Cretaceous Kallokibotion to the family, but moved Riodevemys back into Pleurosternidae. 2022 saw the description of two new compsemydids, the Early Cretaceous Tongemys and the Late Cretaceous Calissounemys, by Joyce et al. and Tong et al. respectively.

Joyce & Rollot (2020) defined Compsemyidae as "the most inclusive group of turtles that includes Compsemys victa but not the baenid Baena arenosa Leidy, 1870, the pleurosternid Pleurosternon bullockii (Owen, 1842), or any extant turtle".

=== Genera ===
- Berruchelus France, Paleocene (some authors include this genus within Compsemys)
- Calissounemys Var, France, Late Cretaceous (Campanian)
- Compsemys North America, Europe, Late Cretaceous–Palaeocene
- Kallokibotion? Hațeg Basin, Romania, Late Cretaceous (Maastrichtian)
- Peltochelys Sainte-Barbe Clays Formation, Belgium, Early Cretaceous (Barremian)
- Riodevemys? Villar del Arzobispo Formation, Spain, Late Jurassic (Tithonian)
- Selenemys? Lourinhã Formation, Portugal, Late Jurassic (Kimmeridgian)
- Tongemys Purbeck Group, England, Early Cretaceous (Berriasian)

== Phylogeny ==
A phylogenetic analysis by Pérez-García et al. (2015) found Compsemydidae to be the most basal (early-diverging) group within Paracryptodira, lying outside Baenoidea, the clade formed by Baenidae and Pleurosternidae. Rollot et al. (2021) instead found Compsemydidae to be more closely related to traditional baenids than to pleurosternids, thus making Compsemydidae a subgroup of Baenidae by definition. Rollot & Joyce (2022) recovered compsemydids as early-diverging paracryptodires when using implied weighting, but the group was placed in a polytomy with Paracryptodira and several other turtle genera when equal weighting was used.

The cladogram below follows the implied weighting analysis of Rollot & Joyce (2022), with the rogue taxa Pleurosternon moncayensis and Scabremys ornata removed:

- Paracryptodira
  - Compsemydidae
    - Kallokibotion bajazidi
    - - Selenemys lusitanica
      - - Peltochelys duchastelii
        - - Compsemys russelli
          - Compsemys victa
  - - Helochelydridae
    - - Dinochelys whitei
      - - Glyptops ornatus
        - - - Dorsetochelys typocardium
            - Uluops uluops
          - Baenoidea
            - Baenidae
            - Pleurosternidae
