= Compsemys =

Compsemys Temporal range: Campanian–Paleocene

Scientific classification
- Kingdom: Animalia
- Phylum: Chordata
- Class: Reptilia
- Clade: Pantestudines
- Clade: Testudinata
- Clade: †Paracryptodira
- Family: †Compsemydidae
- Genus: †Compsemys; Leidy, 1856

Type species
- †Compsemys. victa Osborn, 1905

Species
- C. victa Leidy, 1856; C. puercensis Gilmore, 1919; C. torrejonensis Gilmore, 1919; ?C. russelli (Pérez-García, 2012)

Synonyms
- ?Berruchelus Pérez-García 2012

Extinct genus of compsemyid turtle

Compsemys is an extinct genus of compsemyid turtle that lived in North America and possibly Europe during the Late Cretaceous and Paleocene. The type species, C. victa, was first described by Joseph Leidy from the Hell Creek Formation in Montana in 1856, but Jasinski et al. (2026) suggested most of the specimens referred to C. victa actually represent indeterminate species of this genus. Meanwhile, C. puercensis and C. torrejonensis, both from the Paleocene Nacimiento Formation of New Mexico, are valid species. Another potential species, C. russelli (originally placed in the separate genus Berruchelus), was described in 2012 from Paleocene deposits in France., but Jasinski et el. (2026) suggested Berruchelus represents a distinct genus from Compsemys.

== Description ==
Compsemys was a moderately sized turtle, up to 30 cm (12 in) long, with a carapace covered with raised, flattened tubercles, which are not seen in any other turtle. This allows even small shell fragments to be identified as Compsemys. The skull resembles that of the alligator turtle, with a sharply hooked beak; Compsemys was likely an aquatic carnivore. it was suggested that some materials assigned to this genus are from the Santonian Milk River Formation of the Alberta and the Turonian Straight Cliffs Formation of the Utah, but Jasinski et al. (2026) suggested these are too incomplete to confidently refer to this genus. The morphology of the skull suggests that Compsemys was likely hypercarnivorous.

== Classification ==
Its affinities have long been uncertain, but it has recently been considered to be the most basal member of Paracryptodira, despite the clade first appearing in the Late Jurassic, and is sometimes included in its own family, Compsemydidae. A revision in 2020 found Compsemydidae to be more expansive, also containing Riodevemys and Selenemys from the Late Jurassic of Europe, and Peltochelys from the Early Cretaceous of Europe.
