= Carnegie Quarry =

Fossil site in Utah, U.S.

Carnegie Quarry, also known as Dinosaur Quarry or Douglass Quarry, is a fossil site in Utah that dates to the Jurassic period. It is located in the Morrison Formation. It is part of Dinosaur National Monument, which was founded to protect the site. A portion of the quarry remains unexcavated, and the fossils remain in the ground where they can be viewed by the public at the Quarry Visitor Center.

Carnegie Quarry is considered "one of the most important localities" in the Morrison Formation. Hundreds of specimens have been collected from the site, representing at least ten different dinosaur species and several other kinds of reptile.

== History ==
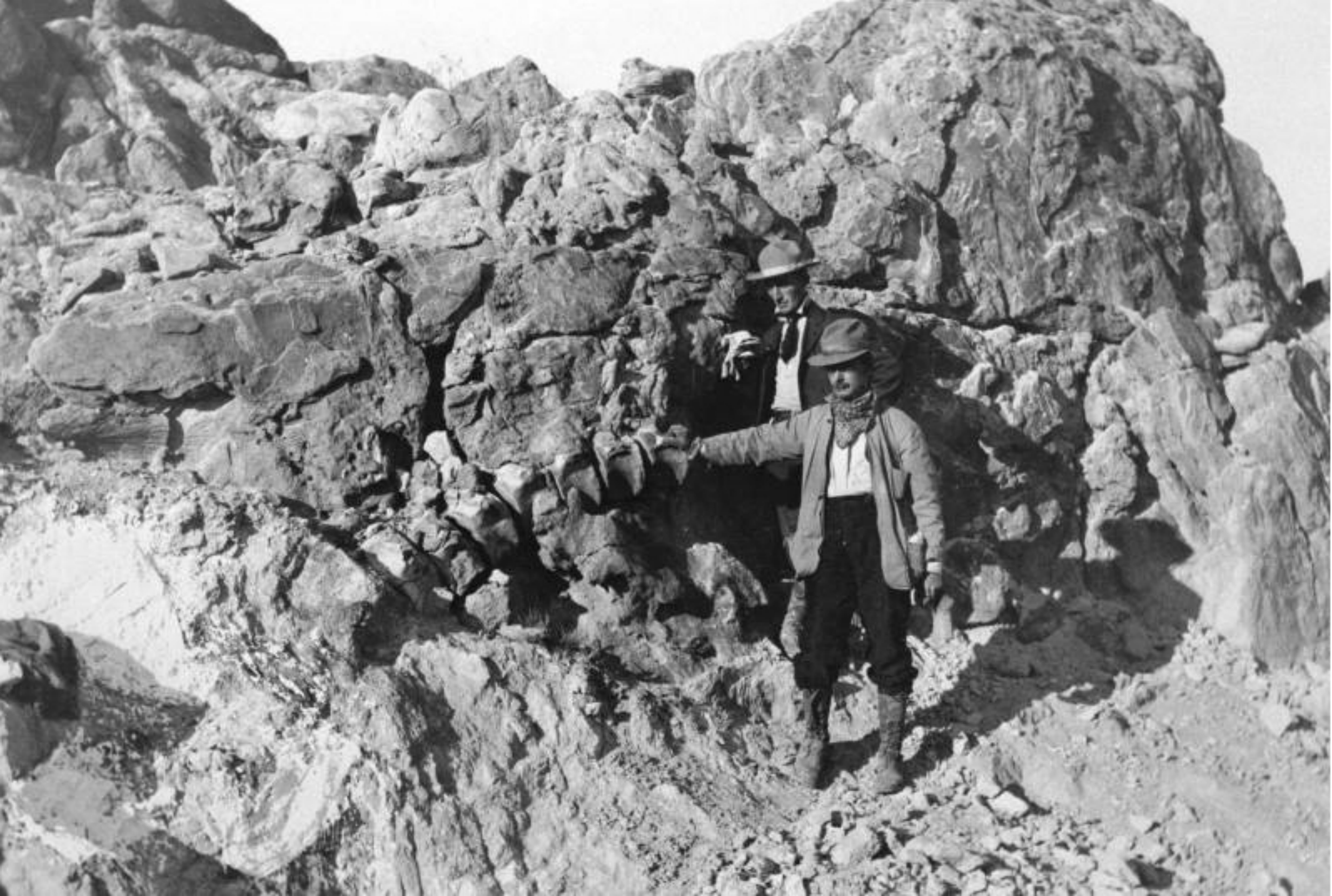
Earl Douglass standing alongside the vertebrae that led to the discovery of the site

In 1909, the Carnegie Museum sent Earl Douglass to search for fossils. After months of unsuccessful searching, on Tuesday, August 17, near Vernal, Utah, Douglass came across a series of tail vertebrae that he identified as Brontosaurus. The discovery immediately attracted local attention. Douglass soon began excavations, and the series of caudal vertebrae proved to belong to a nearly complete skeleton of Apatosaurus. It became apparent that this was one of many specimens in the quarry.

On October 4, 1915, President Woodrow Wilson signed a proclamation establishing Dinosaur National Monument. This took Douglass by surprise, and he was uncertain of how it would affect excavation. Holland was critical of the decision, saying "there are ten thousand other places in the mountains of the West where there are fossils sticking out of the rock...which are just as well worthy of being consecrated as 'national monuments' as is this spot." Holland was subsequently assured by the secretary of the interior that designating the land a national monument was the only way to protect it from private interests. The Carnegie Museum was granted permission to continue excavations at the site. By 1917, the fragmentary condition of many of the fossils being excavated led Holland to become discouraged about the prospect of finding much more material, and Holland considered making 1918 the last year of excavations, but ultimately continued renewing the permit for a few more years. After Andrew Carnegie's death in 1919, funding for the excavation decreased and the Carnegie Museum ceased excavations in 1922. In 1923, the Smithsonian Institution and University of Utah conducted excavations at the site. The collection of fossils from the site then ceased for several decades until the National Park Service resumed excavations in the 1950s.

Quarry map

In 1957, construction of the quarry visitor center began, which was opened in 1958. Approximately 2,000 bones are displayed in the building, left in the rock where they were found. Work on the quarry wall was completed in 1999.

== Geology ==
Carnegie Quarry is located in the Brushy Basin Member of the Morrison Formation. The site has been dated to between 150.91 and 150.04 million years ago. The quarry is located in a sandstone bed known as the Quarry Sandstone. The Quarry Sandstone is unusual for the upper Morrison Formation in being relatively coarse-grained. The depositional environment has been subject to various interpretations. Kenneth Carpenter considered it to have been deposited in a braided river that he called the Quarry River, which he compared to the modern-day Platte River. In contrast, Brezinski and Kollar interpreted the Quarry Sandstone to represent a crevasse splay, with the accumulation of skeletons at Carnegie Quarry having been deposited within one of the distributary channels over the course of at least two flooding events. The quarry bed is tilted 67° from horizontal.

== Fossils ==
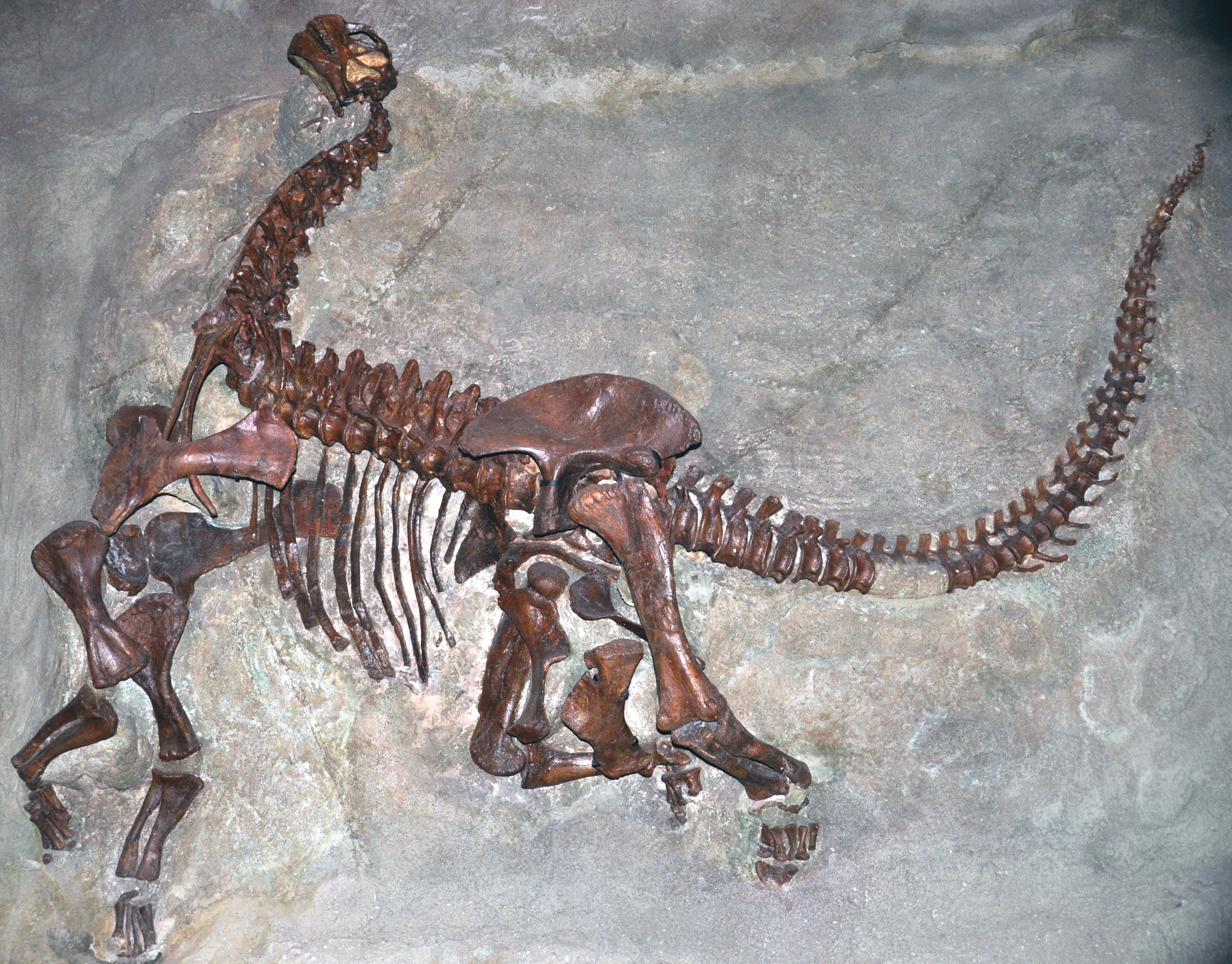
CM 11338, a nearly complete Camarasaurus skeleton

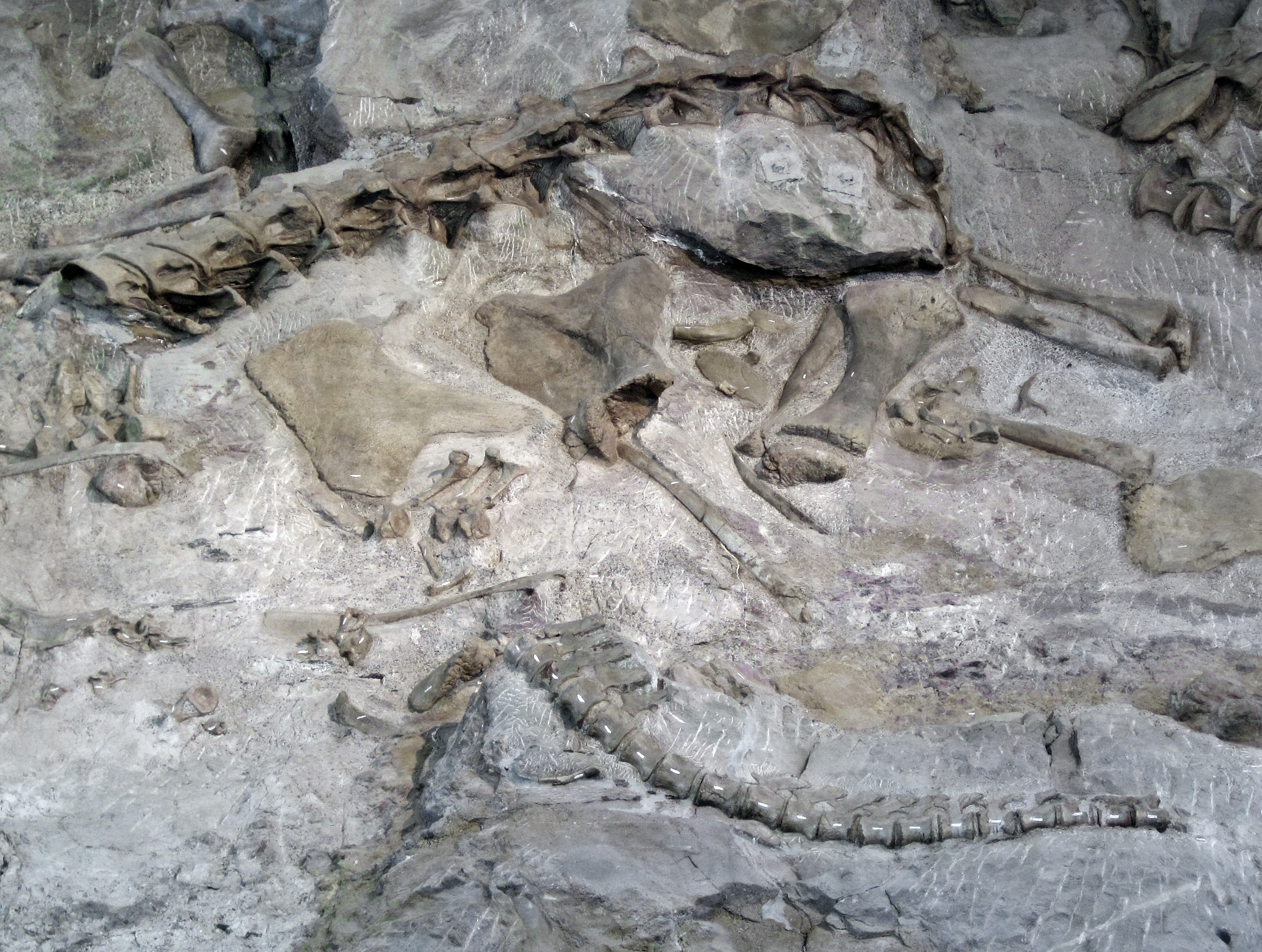
A portion of the quarry that remains in place

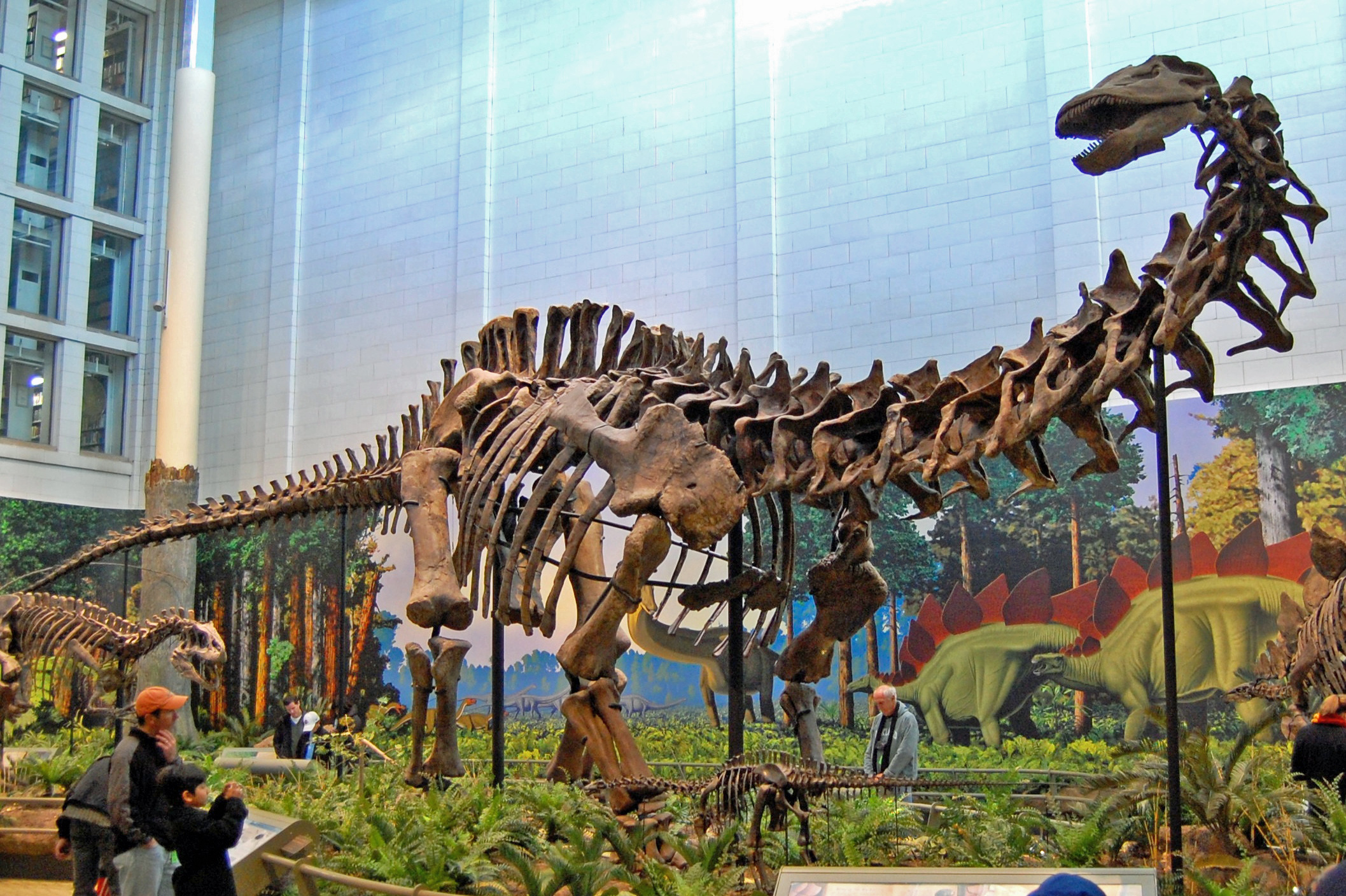
CM 3018, the Apatosaurus specimen that was the first specimen from the quarry to be found, on display at the Carnegie Museum

Carnegie Quarry is the type locality of eight species: the turtles Glyptops utahensis (Note: Glyptops utahensis is now considered a synonym of Glyptops plicatulus) and Dinochelys whitei, protosuchid crocodylomorph Hoplosuchus kayi, the dinosaurs Apatosaurus louisae, Uintasaurus douglassi, (Note: Uintasaurus douglassi is considered a synonym of Camarasaurus lentus.) Camarasaurus annae (Note: Camarasaurus annae is considered a synonym of Camarasaurus lentus) Camptosaurus aphanoecetes, (Note: Camptosaurus aphanoecetes is classified in a separate genus, Uteodon, by some, but not all, researchers.) Dryosaurus elderae, and Athenar bermani.

Numerous scientifically important fossils have been recovered from the quarry, including the most complete sauropod fossil ever found, the juvenile Camarasaurus specimen CM 11338, and the largest nearly complete dinosaur skeleton ever found, the Apatosaurus specimen CM 3018, which was the specimen that led Douglass to discover the site.

Sauropod skeletons from the quarry are displayed at the Smithsonian Museum of Natural History, Royal Ontario Museum, Carnegie Museum of Natural History, American Museum of Natural History, and Denver Museum of Nature and Science.

=== Fossil records ===
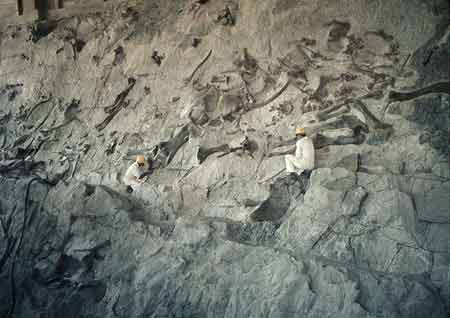
Workers inside the Dinosaur Quarry building

Planta
Coniferophyta
Mollusca
Unio sp.
Vetulonia sp.
Reptilia
Testudines

Glyptops plicatus
Dinochelys whitei

Rhynchocephalia

Opisthias rarus

Pseudosuchia

Goniopholis sp.
Hoplosuchus kayi (Holotype)

Dinosauria
Saurischia

Theropoda

Ceratosaurus sp.
Torvosaurus sp.
Allosaurus fragilis

Sauropoda

Apatosaurus louisae (Holotype)
Barosaurus lentus
Camarasaurus lentus
Diplodocus hallorum
Athenar bermani (Holotype)

Ornithischia

Stegosauria

Stegosaurus ungulatus

Ornithopoda

Uteodon aphanoecetes (Holotype)
Dryosaurus elderae (Holotype)
