= Berruchelus =

Berruchelus Temporal range: 58.7–55.8 Ma

Scientific classification
- Domain: Eukaryota
- Kingdom: Animalia
- Phylum: Chordata
- Class: Reptilia
- Clade: Pantestudines
- Clade: Testudinata
- Clade: †Paracryptodira
- Family: †Compsemydidae
- Genus: †Berruchelus; Pérez-García, 2012
- Species: †B. russelli

Binomial name
- †Berruchelus russelli Pérez-García, 2012

Extinct genus of turtles

Berruchelus is an extinct genus of paracryptodiran turtle from the Paleogene of western Europe. It may be synonymous with Compsemys.
