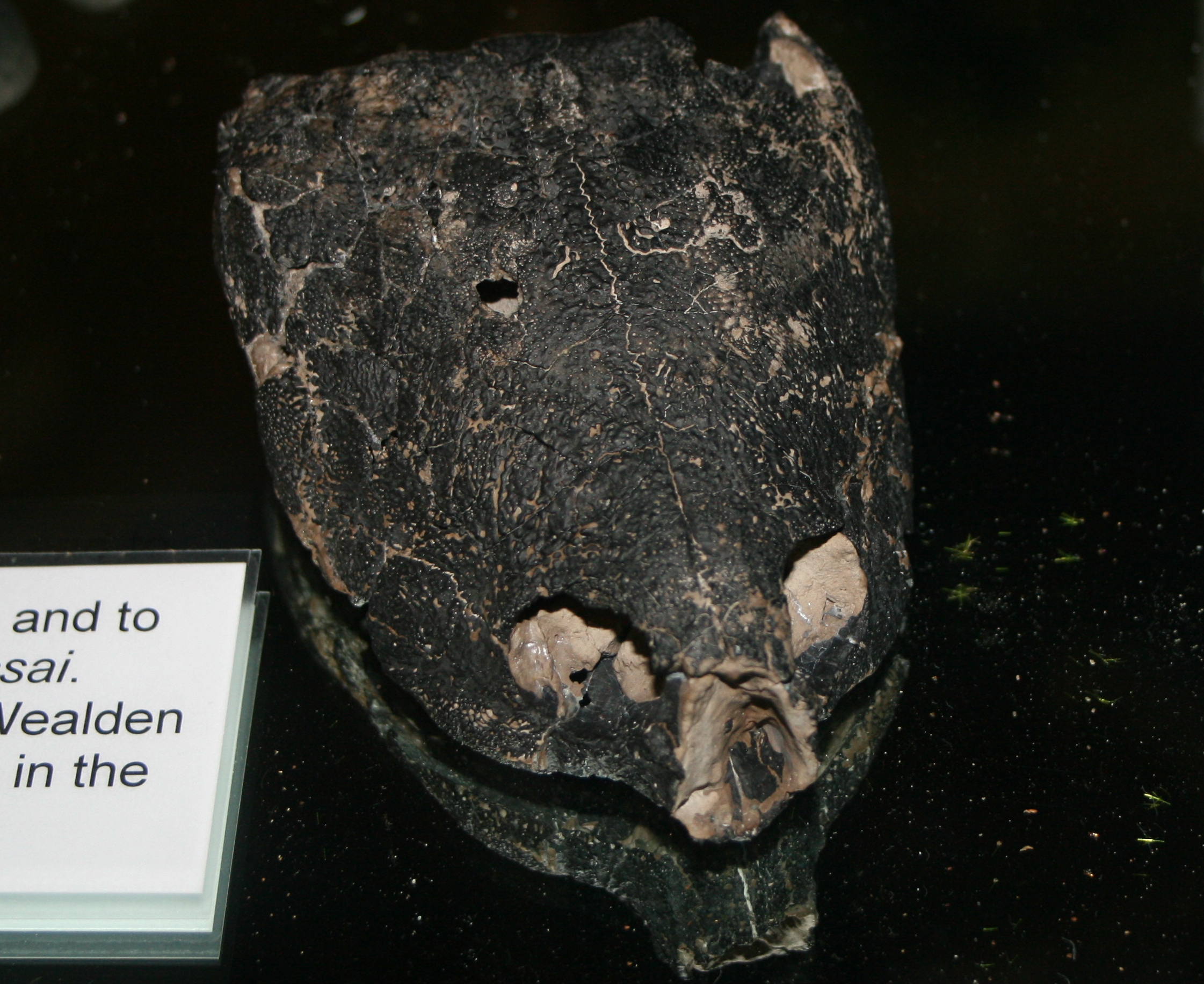

Scientific classification
- Domain: Eukaryota
- Kingdom: Animalia
- Phylum: Chordata
- Class: Reptilia
- Clade: Pantestudines
- Clade: Testudinata
- Family: †Helochelydridae
- Genus: †Helochelydra; Nopcsa, 1928

Type species
- †Helochelydra nopcsai Lapparent de Broin and Murelaga, 1999

= Helochelydra =

Helochelydra Temporal range: Early Cretaceous Barremian

Extinct genus of turtles

Helochelydra is an extinct genus of extinct stem turtle known from the Early Cretaceous (Barremian) of the Isle of Wight, southern England.

== Phylogeny ==
Helochelydra is a member of the stem turtle family Helochelydridae, which is known from Late Jurassic to Late Cretaceous deposits in North America and Europe. Cladistic analysis recovers Helochelydridae outside the clade leading to crown turtles (Testudines).

== Taxonomy ==
Helochelydra was named in 1928 by Franz Baron Nopcsa for a partial shell (NHMUK R171) from the Early Cretaceous Wessex Formation of the Isle of Wight that Lydekker (1889) had referred to Tretosternon punctatum, a turtle taxon from the Purbeck Group of Dorset, but no species name was provided. Lapparent de Broin and Murelaga (1999) recognized Helochelydra as closely related to the Late Cretaceous stem turtle Solemys, and erected the type species epithet nopcsai for NHMUK R171, even as they considered Tretosternon a possible synonym of Pleurosternon. The turtles "Trionyx" bakewelli and "Platychelys" anglica were referred to Helochelydra by Milner (2004) based on morphological similarities with the shell of the type species, but were placed in Compsemyidae by Joyce et al. (2012).
