= Tongemys =

Scientific classification
- Domain: Eukaryota
- Kingdom: Animalia
- Phylum: Chordata
- Class: Reptilia
- Clade: Pantestudines
- Clade: Testudinata
- Clade: †Paracryptodira
- Family: †Compsemydidae
- Genus: †Tongemys; Joyce et al., 2022
- Species: †T. enigmatica

Binomial name
- †Tongemys enigmatica Joyce et al., 2022

Tongemys is an extinct genus of compsemydid turtle that lived in England during the Berriasian. It contains a single species, Tongemys enigmatica.
