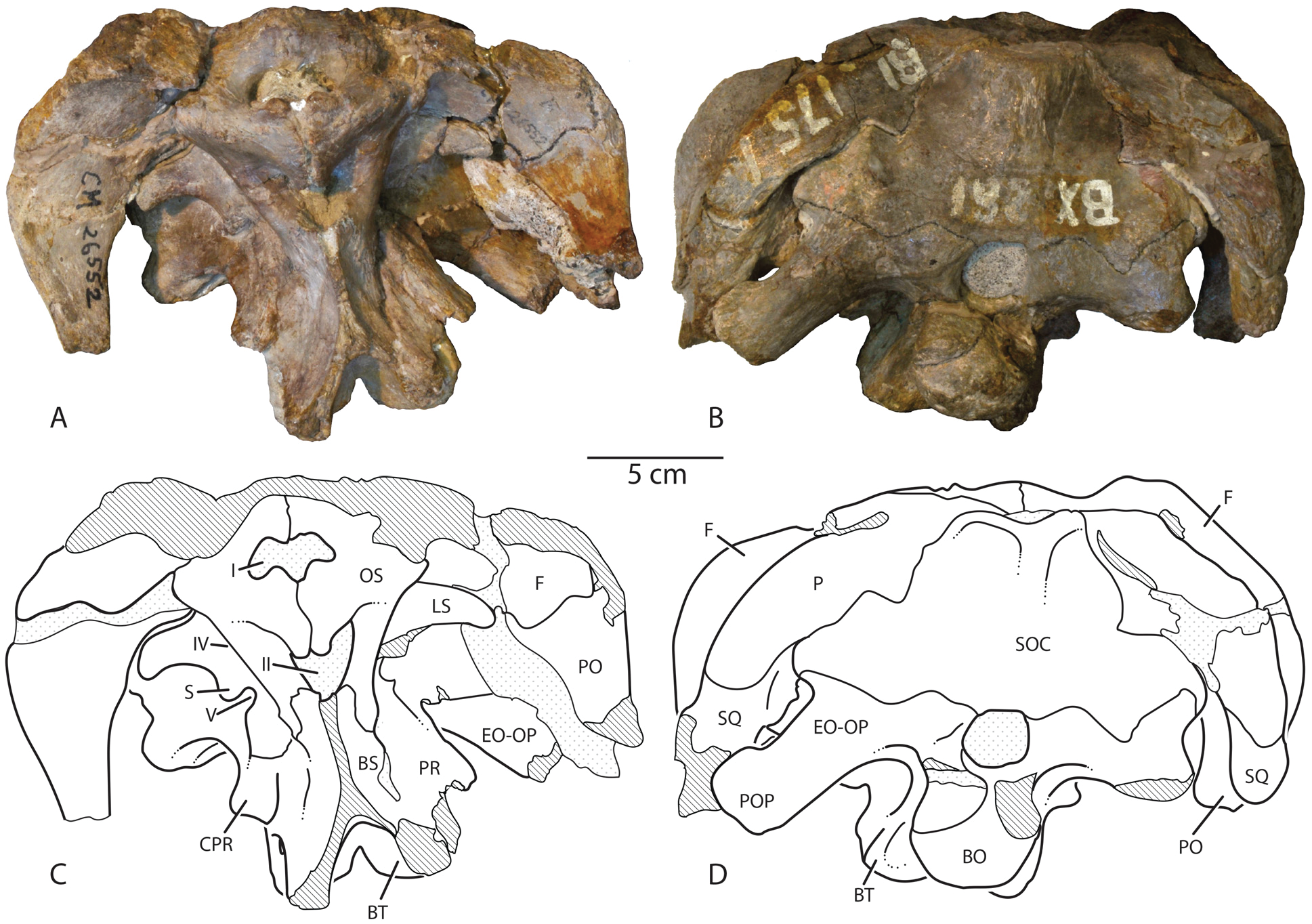
- Holotype braincase of A. bermani

Scientific classification
- Kingdom: Animalia
- Phylum: Chordata
- Class: Reptilia
- Clade: Dinosauria
- Clade: Saurischia
- Clade: †Sauropodomorpha
- Clade: †Sauropoda
- Clade: †Eusauropoda
- Superfamily: †Diplodocoidea
- Family: †Dicraeosauridae
- Genus: †Athenar; Whitlock et al., 2025
- Species: †A. bermani

Binomial name
- †Athenar bermani Whitlock et al., 2025

= Athenar =

Athenar Temporal range: Late Jurassic, Tithonian

Extinct genus of dinosaurs

Athenar is an extinct genus of dicraeosaurid sauropod dinosaur from the Late Jurassic of Utah, United States. The genus contains a single species, Athenar bermani, which was described by John Whitlock and colleagues in 2025 based on the holotype specimen CM 26552: a braincase and skull roof previously ascribed to the genus Diplodocus. The specimen was found in rocks belonging to the Morrison Formation at the Carnegie Quarry at Dinosaur National Monument.

Athenar existed during the Tithonian age of the Late Jurassic, and would have lived alongside other dinosaurs such as the carnivorous Allosaurus and the herbivorous Stegosaurus, Diplodocus and Camptosaurus.

== History and naming ==
The holotype specimen of Athenar, CM 26552, consists of a braincase and partial skull roof that was recovered from Morrison Formation rocks at the Carnegie Quarry at Dinosaur National Monument, Utah. This material was originally collected by Earl Douglass in 1913, before being briefly described in a 1978 publication by John McIntosh and David Berman. In this work, the pair assigned the specimen to Diplodocus, based on characters shared with other skulls of the genus known at the time. This specimen formed the basis for their description of the braincase of Diplodocus.

Whitlock and colleagues published a reevaluation of the specimen in 2025, describing the skull in detail and using methods that came into use after the original description by McIntosh and Berman to explore its phylogenetic position within Diplodocoidea. Following their results, they decided to assign the specimen to the novel genus and species Athenar bermani.

=== Etymology ===
The generic name Athenar refers to Cleveland metal artist Athenar, whose music was "the soundtrack to the majority of the work done on this specimen". The specific epithet bermani honors David Berman who, together with McIntosh, carried out much of the foundational modern work on diplodocoid skulls at the Carnegie Museum of Natural History and was responsible for the initial description of the holotype specimen.

== Description ==
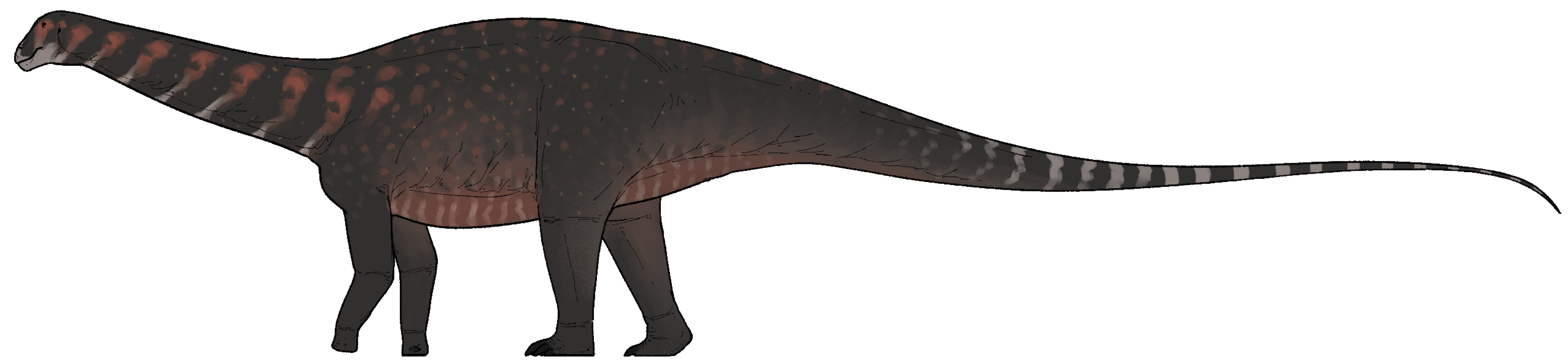
Hypothetical life restoration

The type and only specimen of Athenar consists of a braincase and partial skull roof, containing portions of the right and left frontal bones, both parietal bones, partial postorbital bones and portions of the squamosals. A distal portion of the right paraoccipital process and part of the right squamosal were found with the specimen and later attached with plaster, although this has fractured with no way of connecting the elements back together.

Although the holotype material is quite large when compared to the subadult and adult specimens of Diplodocus, Whitlock and colleagues consider it to belong to a 'subadult' individual due to the presence of sutures between many of the elements of the braincase.

== Classification ==
While originally assigned to Diplodocus, Whitlock and colleagues propose an alternative phylogenetic placement for the specimen in the clade Dicraeosauridae. Dicraeosaurids are closely related to the diplodocids (which includes the namesake Diplodocus), and are characterised by their overall smaller size and shorter necks when compared to other flagellicaudatans. While the skull possesses a number of characteristics of both Diplodocidae and Dicraeosauridae, Whitlock and colleagues consider the dicraeosaurid characters to be more numerous than the diplodocid ones. This includes the presence of frontoparietal and postparietal fenestrae (holes in the skull) and the presence of a distinct prong on the squamosal bone, among other features.

Three other dicraeosaurid taxa are known to be coeval with Athenar: Kaatedocus, Smitanosaurus and Suuwassea. The taxon has two notable differences in skull anatomy when compared to all three, and was potentially larger in adult size and younger in age than Suuwassea. However, in both Suuwassea and Athenar the frontal bone contributes to the supratemporal fenestra, which may indicate a close relationship between the two taxa. The taxon also shares traits with non-North American dicraeosaurs like Amargasaurus.

== Paleoecology ==
Athenar is known from the Late Jurassic Morrison Formation, a rock sequence with outcrops throughout the western United States and is known for its rich dinosaur fauna. Radiometric dating indicates the formation is about 156.3 million years old (Ma) at the base and up to 146.8 million years old at the top, placing it within the latest Oxfordian, Kimmeridgian, and early Tithonian ages of the Late Jurassic epoch. The Morrison Formation is comparable in age and faunal composition to the Lourinhã Formation in Portugal and the Tendaguru Formation in Tanzania.

The holotype of Athenar was found in the Carnegie Quarry, located at Dinosaur National Monument in Utah. Animals that lived alongside it include the herbivorous ornithischians Stegosaurus, Dryosaurus and Camptosaurus, the carnivorous theropods Allosaurus and Ceratosaurus and numerous other sauropod taxa, including Diplodocus, Apatosaurus, Barosaurus and Camarasaurus.
