= Obernkirchen Sandstein =

Geologic formation in Germany

- Stratigraphic range: Late Berriasian
- Type: Geological formation
- Unit of: Bückeberg Formation (Obernkirchen Member)
- Thickness: Up to 20 m (66 ft)

Lithology
- Primary: Sandstone
- Other: Coal, mudstone

Location
- Coordinates: 52.3°N 9.1°E
- Approximate paleocoordinates: 43.5°N 17.6°E
- Region: Niedersachsen
- Country: Germany
- Extent: Lower Saxony Basin
- Obernkirchen Sandstein (Germany)

The Obernkirchen Sandstein or Obernkirchen Sandstone is a geological unit in Lower Saxony, Germany whose strata date back to the Early Cretaceous. The remains of the dinosaur Stenopelix and numerous dinosaur tracks are known from the unit. The unit is a thin interval within the Bückeberg Formation As its name would suggest the lithology primarily consists of sandstone with thin intercalations of coal. This was deposited in a sandy barrier to lagoonal complex setting. The unit has historically been extensively quarried for its high quality building stone, which has been used as far away as Jakarta.

== Vertebrate paleofauna ==
Ornithischians of the Obernkirchen Sandstein
Taxa	Presence	Notes	Images
Infraorder: Ankylosauria; 1. Tracks	Niedersachsen		
Genus: Euornithopoda; 1. Tracks	Niedersachsen		
Genus: Iguanodon; 1. Iguanodon sp.	Niedersachsen		
Order: ?Ornithischia; 1. Possible ornithischian tracks.	Niedersachsen		
Genus: Stenopelix; 1. S. valdensis.	Niedersachsen	"Partial skeleton, no skull."	
Suborder: Theropoda; 1. Indeterminate remains.; 2. Tracks	Niedersachsen	"(= Megalosaurus dunkeri)"	

== See also ==
- List of dinosaur-bearing rock formations
