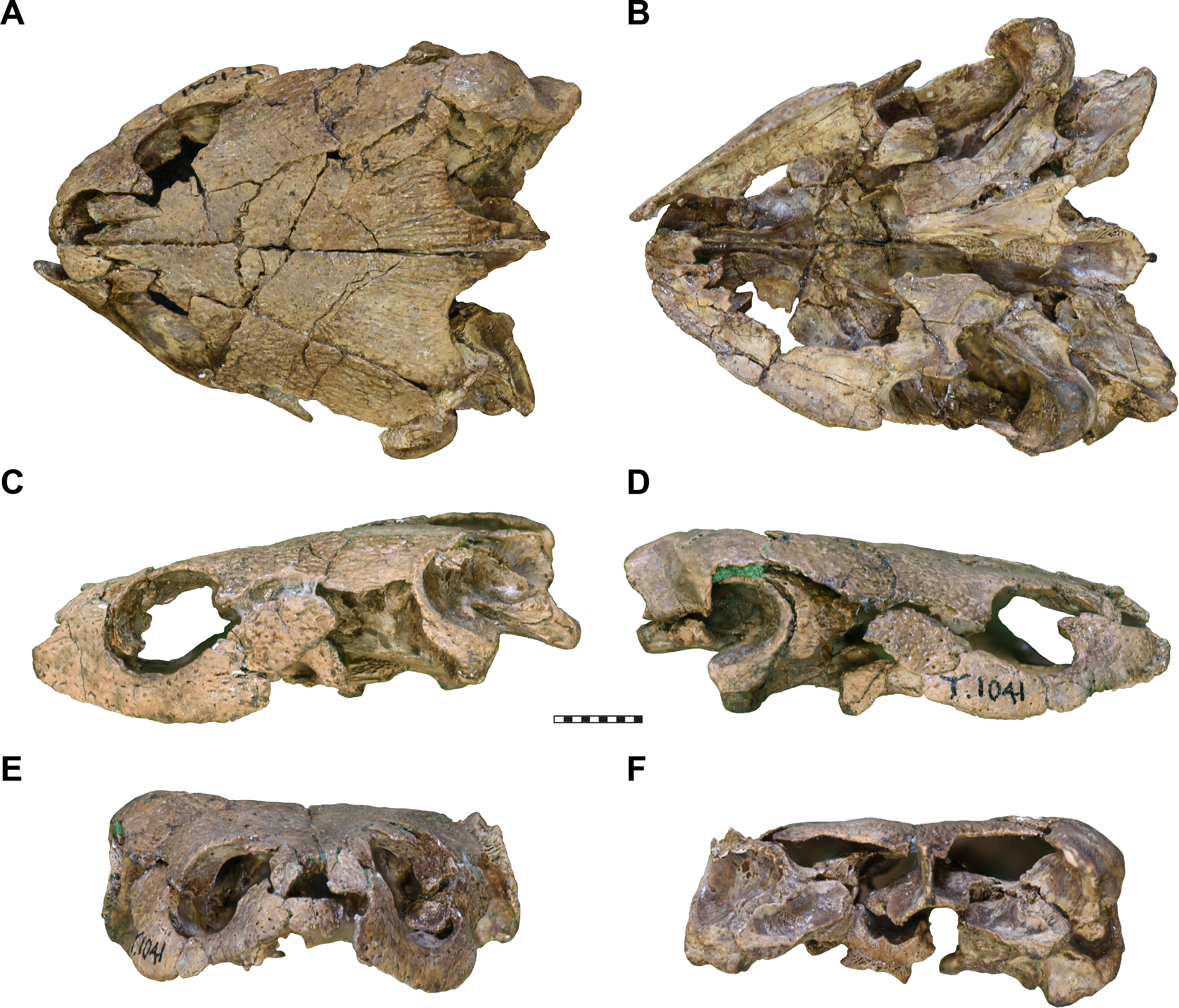
- Pleurosternon skull
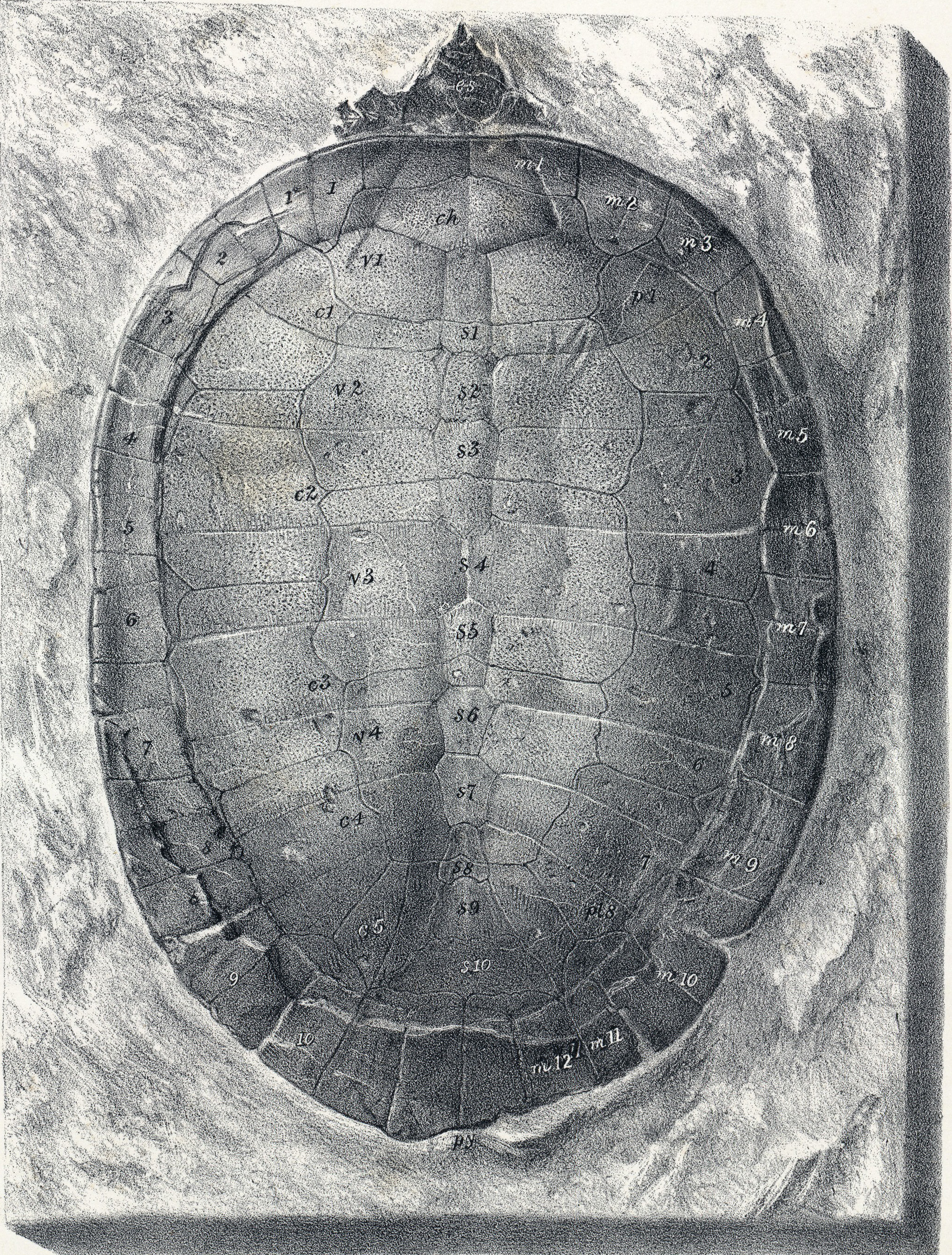
- Pleurosternon shell

Scientific classification
- Kingdom: Animalia
- Phylum: Chordata
- Class: Reptilia
- Clade: Pantestudines
- Clade: Testudinata
- Clade: †Paracryptodira
- Superfamily: †Baenoidea
- Family: †Pleurosternidae; Cope, 1868

= Pleurosternidae =

Pleurosternids Temporal range: Kimmeridgian–Albian

Extinct family of turtles

Pleurosternidae is an extinct family of freshwater turtles belonging to Paracryptodira. They are definitively known from the Late Jurassic to Early Cretaceous (Albian) of Western Europe and North America.

== Genera ==
=== Valid taxa ===
- Dinochelys Morrison Formation, United States, Late Jurassic (Tithonian)
- Dorsetochelys Purbeck Group, England, Early Cretaceous (Berriasian) Bückeberg Formation, Germany, Berriasian
- Glyptops Morrison Formation, United States, Late Jurassic (Tithonian)
- Pleurosternon Purbeck Group, England, Early Cretaceous (Berriasian), Ágreda locality, Spain, Tithonian-Berriasian, France, Tithonian-Berriasian
- Riodevemys Villar del Arzobispo Formation, Spain, Late Jurassic (Tithonian)
- Selenemys Lourinhã Formation, Portugal, Late Jurassic (Kimmeridgian)
- Toremys Escucha Formation, Spain, Early Cretaceous (Albian)

Uluops from the Late Jurassic of North America may also belong to Pleurosternidae.

=== Invalid taxa ===
- Desmemys Bückeberg Formation, Germany, Berriasian (nomen dubium)

== Ecology ==
The high morphological diversity of skulls of the group suggests high ecological plasticity. Glyptops and Pleurosternon exhibit adaptations likely for suction feeding, while Dorsteochelys was likely a dietary generalist.
