= Toremys =

Toremys Temporal range: Albian

Scientific classification
- Kingdom: Animalia
- Phylum: Chordata
- Class: Reptilia
- Clade: Pantestudines
- Clade: Testudinata
- Clade: †Paracryptodira
- Family: †Pleurosternidae
- Genus: †Toremys; Pérez-García et al., 2015

Type species
- Toremys cassiopeia

Extinct genus of turtles

Toremys is an extinct genus of pleurosternid that inhabited Spain during the Albian stage of the Early Cretaceous epoch. It is a monotypic taxon known from a single species, T. cassiopeia.
