= Selenemys =

Selenemys Temporal range: Late Jurassic, 151 Ma

Scientific classification
- Domain: Eukaryota
- Kingdom: Animalia
- Phylum: Chordata
- Class: Reptilia
- Clade: Pantestudines
- Clade: Testudinata
- Clade: †Paracryptodira
- Family: †Pleurosternidae
- Genus: †Selenemys; Pérez-García & Ortega, 2011
- Species: †S. lusitanica

Binomial name
- †Selenemys lusitanica Pérez-García & Ortega, 2011

Extinct genus of turtles

Selenemys is an extinct genus of pleurosternid turtle from the Late Jurassic of Central West of Portugal. It is known from several specimens recovered from the Lusitanian Basin, dating to the upper Kimmeridgian age. It was one of the earliest European pleurosternids, more closely related to the later Cretaceous pleurosternids of Europe than the contemporary pleurosternids of North America. This genus was named by Adán Pérez-García and Francisco Ortega in 2011, and the type species is Selenemys lusitanica.

The holotype is housed at the Laboratory of Paleontology and Paleoecology of the ALT-Society of Natural History (Torres Vedras, Portugal).
