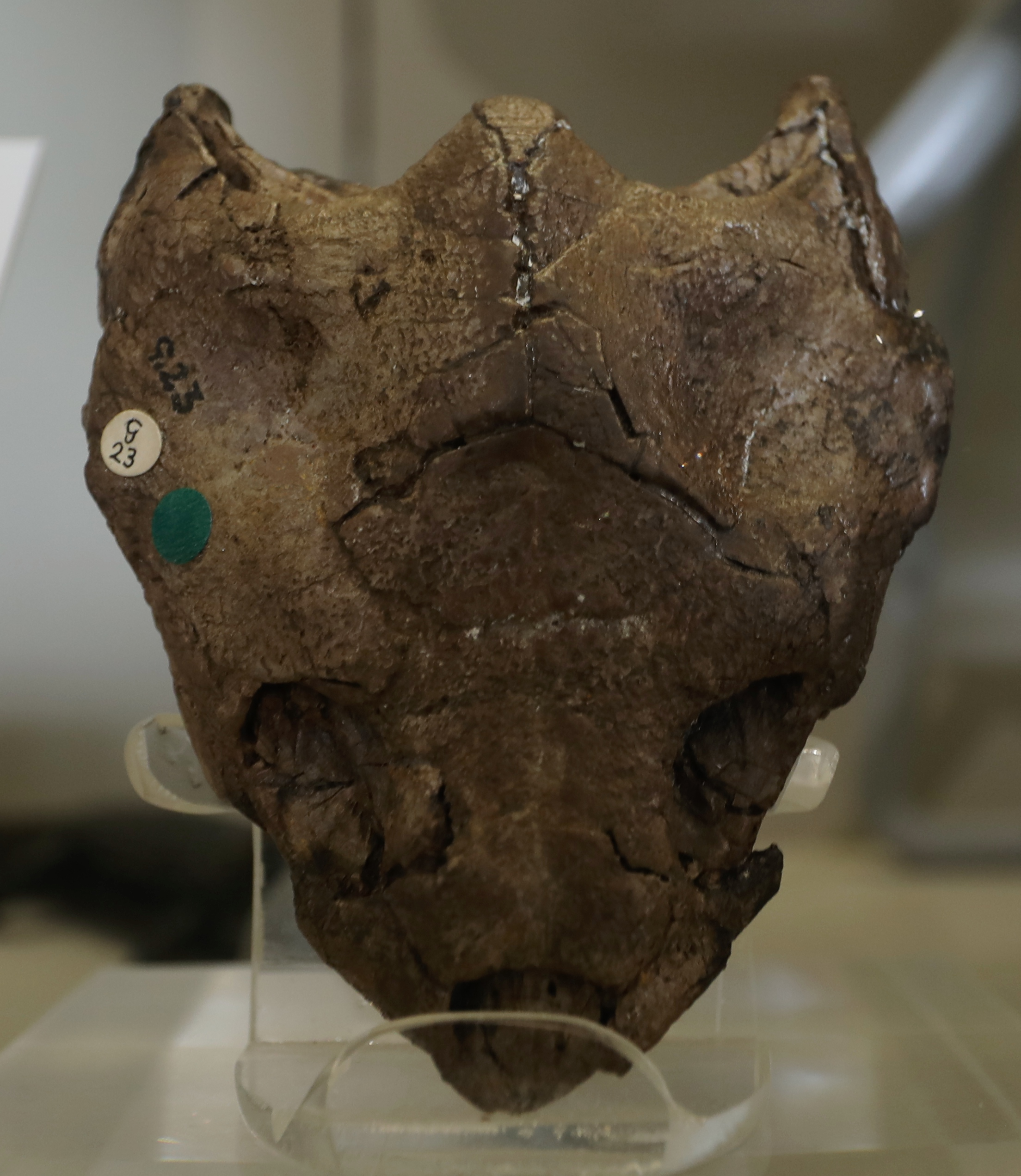

Scientific classification
- Domain: Eukaryota
- Kingdom: Animalia
- Phylum: Chordata
- Class: Reptilia
- Clade: Pantestudines
- Clade: Testudinata
- Clade: †Paracryptodira
- Family: †Pleurosternidae
- Genus: †Dorsetochelys; Evans and Kemp, 1976

Species
- D. delairi Evans and Kemp, 1976 (type); D. typocardium (Seeley, 1869); D. bueckebergensis (Karl, Groning, Brauckmann, and Reich, 2012)

Synonyms
- Pleurosternon typocardium Seeley, 1869; Thalassemys ruetimeyeri Lydekker, 1889; Ballerstedtia Karl, Groning, Brauckmann, and Reich, 2012

= Dorsetochelys =

Dorsetochelys Temporal range: Late Jurassic-Early Cretaceous 145–143 Ma

Extinct genus of turtles

Dorsetochelys is an extinct genus of turtle from the Early Cretaceous of southern England and northwestern Germany.

== Taxonomy ==
The type species, Dorsetochelys delairi, was described on the basis of DORCM G.23, a complete skull from the Early Cretaceous (Berriasian) Purbeck Group of Dorset, England. Later, a turtle skull from the vicinity of Como Bluff, Wyoming, was described as a new species, D. buzzops, in honor of Buzz Pitman, a museum director of the Rock River Museum near Como Bluff. However, a cladistic analysis conducted in 2013 recovered that species as a member of Baenidae, sister to Uluops.

In 2012, pleurosternid remains were described from the Early Cretaceous (Berriasian) Bückeberg Formation of Lower Saxony, northwestern Germany, and this prompted a re-assessment of the problematic species "Pleurosternon" typocardium, which had been tentatively referred to Glyptops by Milner (2004). The new genus Ballerstedtia was coined for "P." typocardium, and the remains from Lower Saxony were named B. bueckergensis. In a paper published in 2014, Ballerstedtia was synonymized with Dorsetochelys.
