= Helochelys =

Helochelys Temporal range: Early Cretaceous Cenomanian

Scientific classification
- Domain: Eukaryota
- Kingdom: Animalia
- Phylum: Chordata
- Class: Reptilia
- Clade: Pantestudines
- Clade: Testudinata
- Family: †Helochelydridae
- Genus: †Helochelys von Meyer, 1854

Type species
- Helochelys danubina von Meyer, 1854

Extinct genus of turtles

Helochelys is an extinct genus of stem turtle known from the Late Cretaceous (Cenomanian) of southern Germany.
