= Riodevemys =

Riodevemys Temporal range: Late Jurassic

Scientific classification
- Kingdom: Animalia
- Phylum: Chordata
- Class: Reptilia
- Clade: Pantestudines
- Clade: Testudinata
- Clade: †Paracryptodira
- Family: †Pleurosternidae
- Genus: †Riodevemys; Pérez-García et al., 2015

Riodevemys is an extinct genus of pleurosternid turtle that inhabited Spain during the Late Jurassic epoch. It is known from a single species, R. inumbragigas.
