= Bückeberg Group =

Geological formation in Germany

- Stratigraphic range: Berriasian; ~145–139 Ma
- Type: Group
- Unit of: Lower Saxony Basin
- Sub-units: Ostenwald & Obernkirchen Sandstein Members
- Underlies: Stadthagen Formation
- Overlies: Münder Formation
- Thickness: Over 500 m (1,600 ft)

Lithology
- Primary: Mudstone
- Other: Sandstone, coal

Location
- Coordinates: 52.3°N 9.2°E
- Approximate paleocoordinates: 43.5°N 17.2°E
- Region: Niedersachsen, Nordrhein-Westfalen
- Country: Germany
- Bückeberg Group (Germany)

The Bückeberg Group, formerly known as the Bückeberg Formation, is a stratigraphic group and Lagerstätte in Germany. It preserves fossils dating back to the Berriasian of the Cretaceous period. The Bückeberg Formation has previously been considered to constitute the "German Wealden" in reference to its similarity to the Wealden Group in the United Kingdom. It containsthe Isterberg and Deister Formations. The plesiosaur Brancasaurus, an indeterminate ankylosaur referred to Hylaeosaurus, the turtle Dorsetochelys are known from the formation.

== See also ==
- List of fossiliferous stratigraphic units in Germany
