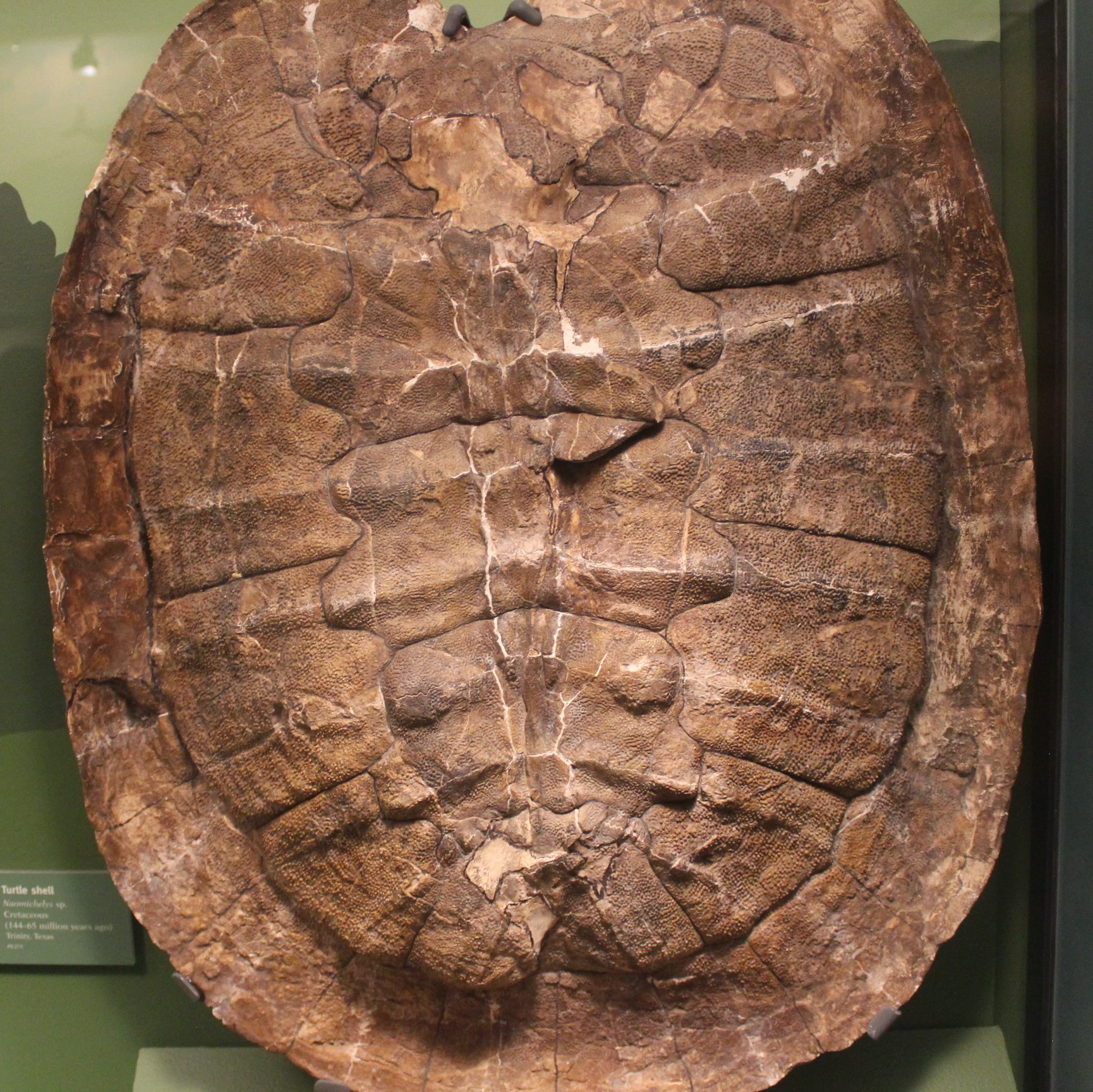
- Fossil carapace of N. speciosa, Field Museum of Natural History

Scientific classification
- Kingdom: Animalia
- Phylum: Chordata
- Class: Reptilia
- Clade: Pantestudines
- Clade: Testudinata
- Family: †Helochelydridae
- Genus: †Naomichelys; Hay, 1908

Type species
- Naomichelys speciosa Hay, 1908

= Naomichelys =

Naomichelys Temporal range: Early Cretaceous Aptian–Campanian

Extinct genus of turtles

Naomichelys is an extinct genus of helochelydrid stem turtle known from the Cretaceous (Aptian-Campanian) of North America. It is the only member of the family known to be native to North America.

== Distribution ==
Naomichelys is known numerous remains from western North America, most notably the holotype partial shell from the Cloverly Formation of Montana and a complete skeleton from the Antlers Formation of Texas. Indeterminate remains are known extending up to the Campanian in the United States and Canada. It is the only known North American member of Helochelydridae.

== Location ==
After

- Kootenai Formation, Montana, Early Cretaceous (Aptian)
- Arundel Formation, Maryland, Aptian
- Cloverly Formation, Montana and Wyoming, Aptian
- Trinity Group, Texas, Aptian-Albian
- Willow Tank Formation, Nevada, Albian
- Cedar Mountain Formation, Utah, Albian-Cenomanian
- Kaskapau Formation, British Columbia, Turonian
- Straight Cliffs Formation, Utah, Turonian-Santonian
- Tropic Shale, Utah, Turonian-Santonian
- Mooreville Chalk, Alabama, Santonian-Campanian
- Milk River Formation, Alberta, Santonian-Campanian
- Foremost Formation, Campanian
- Two Medicine Formation, Montana, Campanian
- Mesaverde Formation, Wyoming, Campanian
- Wahweap Formation, Utah, Campanian
- Menefee Formation, New Mexico Campanian

== Taxonomy ==
Naomichelys is a member of the family Helochelydridae, which is known from Late Jurassic to Late Cretaceous deposits in North America and Europe.
