= Lakotemys =

Lakotemys Temporal range: Early Cretaceous

Scientific classification
- Kingdom: Animalia
- Phylum: Chordata
- Class: Reptilia
- Clade: Pantestudines
- Clade: Testudinata
- Clade: †Paracryptodira
- Family: †Baenidae
- Genus: †Lakotemys; Joyce et al., 2020

Extinct genus of turtle

Lakotemys is an extinct genus of baenid turtle that lived in South Dakota during the Early Cretaceous epoch. It is known from a single species, L. australodakotensis.
