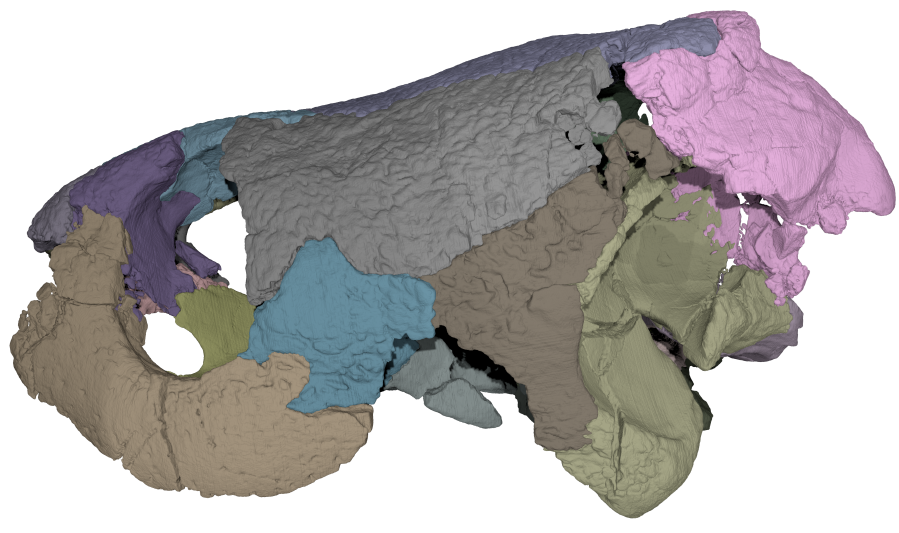
- 3D render of the skull

Scientific classification
- Kingdom: Animalia
- Phylum: Chordata
- Class: Reptilia
- Clade: Pantestudines
- Clade: Testudinata
- Clade: †Paracryptodira
- Family: †Pleurosternidae
- Genus: †Uluops; Carpenter and Bakker, 1990
- Species: †U. uluops

Binomial name
- †Uluops uluops Carpenter and Bakker, 1990

= Uluops =

Uluops Temporal range: Late Jurassic 150.8–145.5 Ma

Extinct genus of turtles

Uluops is an extinct genus of paracryptodire turtle known from the Late Jurassic (Tithonian) of North America. It is represented by a single skull recovered from the Morrison Formation of Wyoming. Originally described as a member of Baenidae, phylogenetic analyses now place it as the most basal member of Pleurosternidae.

== Discovery and naming ==
The holotype specimen, UCM 53971, was discovered at the Main Breakfast Bench Quarry at Como Bluff, Wyoming. It was recovered from the Brushy Basin Member of the Morrison Formation, dating to the Late Jurassic (Tithonian). The quarry has produced a diverse assemblage of Late Jurassic vertebrates from the Breakfast Bench Beds.

The genus and species were named and described in 1990 by Kenneth Carpenter and Robert T. Bakker, who initially classified it within the Baenidae based on perceived affinities with the genus Plesiobaena. In 2021, Yann Rollot and colleagues published a comprehensive redescription of the taxon using µCT scans, providing new data on its internal cranial anatomy.

== Description ==
The skull of Uluops is relatively short, broad, and highly domed, measuring approximately 44.4 mm in length and 39.6 mm in width. The orbits are oriented laterally. The skull surface is marked by small, irregular tubercles, similar to those found in the related genera Glyptops and Pleurosternon.

Notable anatomical features include a strongly curved maxillary cutting edge and a reduced lingual ridge anteriorly. Uluops is characterized by the presence of a canalis caroticus lateralis (the canal for the palatine artery), a primitive trait that is typically lost in more derived paracryptodires such as the Baenidae. It is the only pleurosternid in which this canal can be confidently identified, which indicates the retention of a primitive condition in the cranial arterial system of paracryptodires. Other diagnostic traits include a foramen palatinum posterius formed entirely by the palatine bone and an anteriorly convex nasal–frontal suture.

== Classification ==
Though originally placed within Baenidae due to its wedge-shaped skull, modern phylogenetic analysis identifies Uluops as the earliest branching member of the Pleurosternidae. The baenid-like traits observed in the skull are considered a result of convergent evolution. As the earliest branching member of Pleurosternidae in current phylogenetic analyses, Uluops is united with more derived pleurosternids by a jugal that does not extend deeply ventrally and an extensive supraoccipital exposure on the skull roof.

This placement suggests that several cranial similarities with baenids evolved independently.

== See also ==
- Paleobiota of the Morrison Formation
