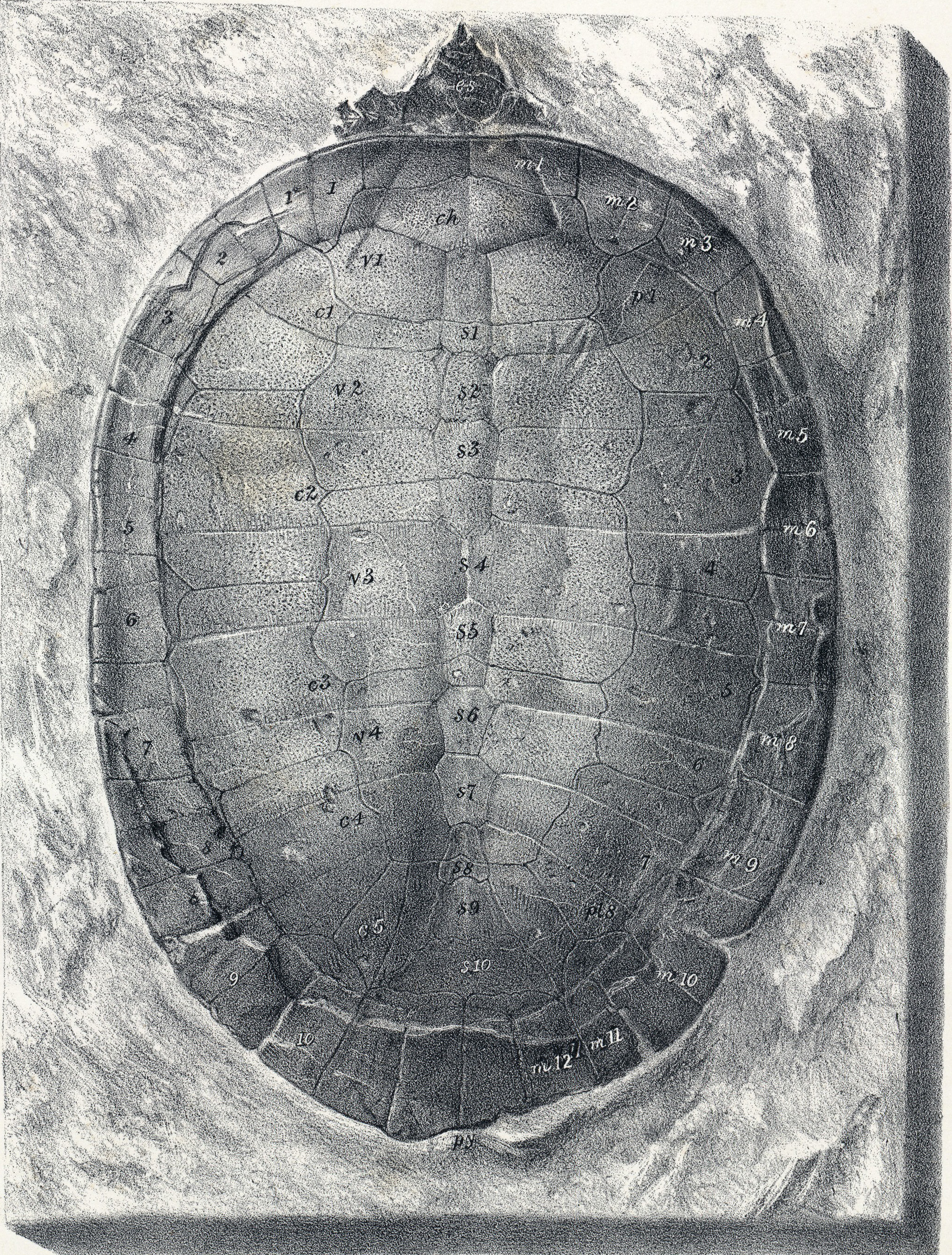
- Pleurosternon (ovatum) bullockii fossil

Scientific classification
- Kingdom: Animalia
- Phylum: Chordata
- Class: Reptilia
- Clade: Pantestudines
- Clade: Testudinata
- Clade: †Paracryptodira
- Family: †Pleurosternidae
- Genus: †Pleurosternon; Owen, 1853

Species
- †P. bullockii (Owen, 1842) (type); †P. moncayensis Pérez-Garcia, 2021

= Pleurosternon =

Pleurosternon Temporal range: Tithonian–Berriasian

Extinct genus of turtles

Pleurosternon is an extinct genus of freshwater pleurosternid turtle from the latest Jurassic to earliest Cretaceous of Europe. Its type species, P. bullockii, was described by the paleontologist Richard Owen (noted for coining the word Dinosauria) in 1853. Since then, and throughout the late 19th century, many fossil turtles were incorrectly assigned to this genus, though only two are currently considered valid.

== Taxonomy ==
Pleurosternon bullockii fossils were first described by Richard Owen in 1841 from specimens found in the earliest Cretaceous (Berriasian) aged Purbeck Group of the Isle of Purbeck, of Dorset in southern England, under the living genus Platemys. It was not until 1853 however, that it was published under the name Pleurosternon in a paper Owen presented to the Palaeontographical Society. P. portlandicum named by Richard Lydekker in 1889 from the latest Jurassic (Tithonian) aged Portland Stone of the Isle of Portland, Dorset, is now considered a junior synonym of the P. bullockii. In 2021 a second valid species, Pleurosternon moncayensis, was named from the Ágreda locality of Tarazona y el Moncayo, Aragon, Spain, which spans the Tithonian-Berriasian transition.

== Description ==
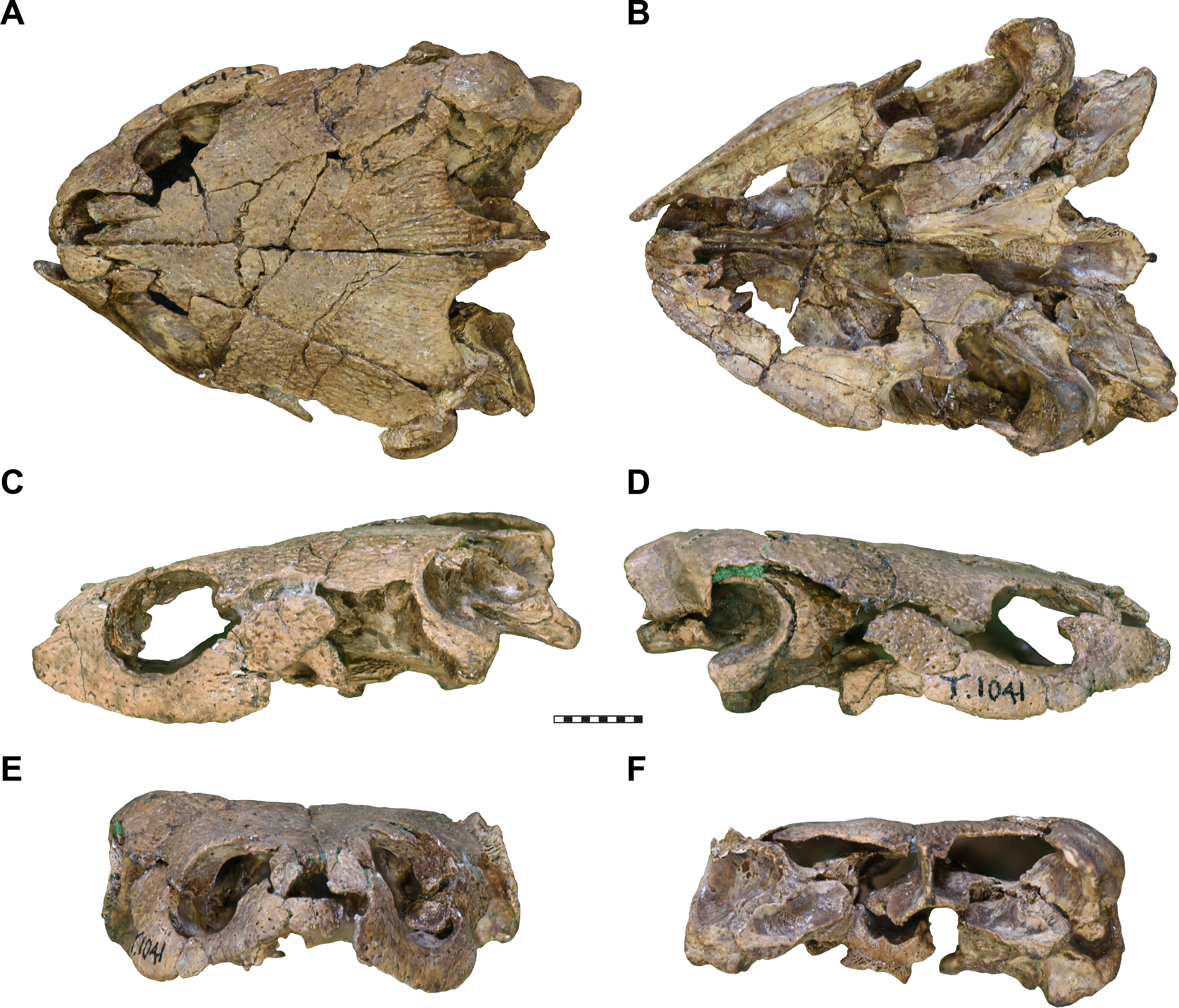
Skull of Pleurosternon bullockii

Pleurosternon has a very depressed carapace, much flatter than similar genera, such as the North American Late Jurassic and Early Cretaceous Glyptops. Adults show little or none of the nuchal emargination that is more visible in juveniles. The Xiphiplastras also have a large, V-shaped notch near the back of the bone. The skull of P. bullockii is similar to that of other pleurosternids, and is similar in some aspects to those of pleurodires. The known shell specimens of P. bullockii exhibit a large amount of variability, and also exhibit sexual dimorphism.

== Distribution and habitat ==
In Europe, P. bullockii is best known from southeast England's Purbeck Group and Portland stone, with over sixty carapaces known from the Purbeck Group alone. Several areas within the formation became noted by some for producing Pleurosternon fossils. Among them were Swanage, Durlston Bay, Langton Matravers, and Herston. P. bullockii is also known from disarticulated shell elements found in Tithonian aged deposits near Wimille in Pas-de-Calais in northern France. As well as from numerous remains found in the Berriasian aged Angeac-Charente bonebed in western France, where it is the most abundant turtle. The Purbeck Group, at the time was a coastal region with a complex system of shallow lagoons that slowly lost their salinity over time. The Portland stone, however is a maritime deposit of slightly older age than the Purbeck, most bones found there are interpreted as having washed out to sea.

== See also ==
- Glyptops
- Chengyuchelys
- Helochelys
