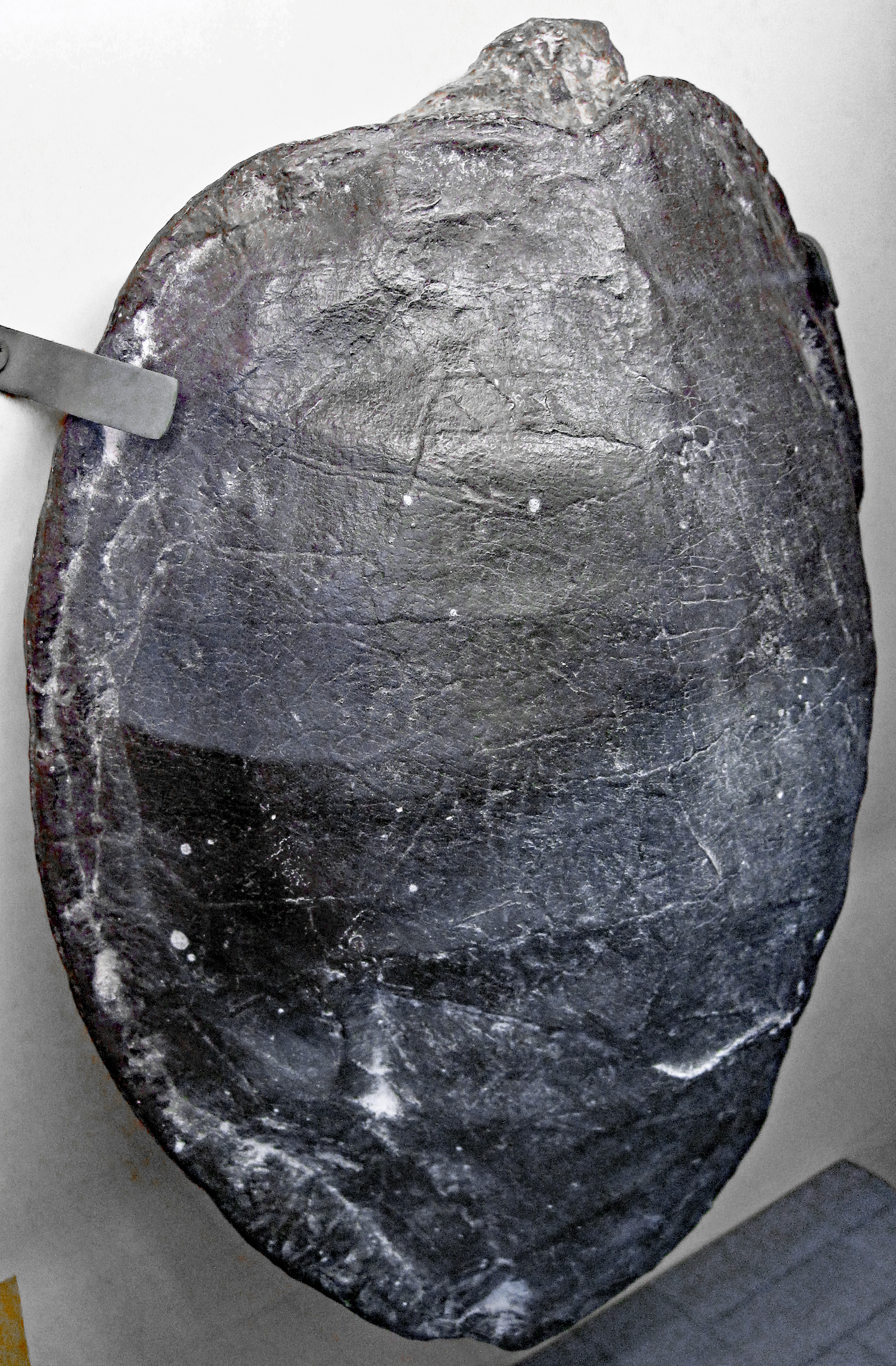
- Shell of D. whitei

Scientific classification
- Domain: Eukaryota
- Kingdom: Animalia
- Phylum: Chordata
- Class: Reptilia
- Clade: Pantestudines
- Clade: Testudinata
- Clade: †Paracryptodira
- Family: †Pleurosternidae
- Genus: †Dinochelys; Gaffney, 1979
- Species: †D. whitei

Binomial name
- †Dinochelys whitei Gaffney, 1979

= Dinochelys =

Dinochelys Temporal range: Late Jurassic

Extinct genus of turtles

Dinochelys (from a reference to the Dinosaur National Monument Visitor Center and Greek chelys, turtle) is an extinct genus of paracryptodiran turtle from the Late Jurassic Morrison Formation.

== See also ==
- Paleobiota of the Morrison Formation
