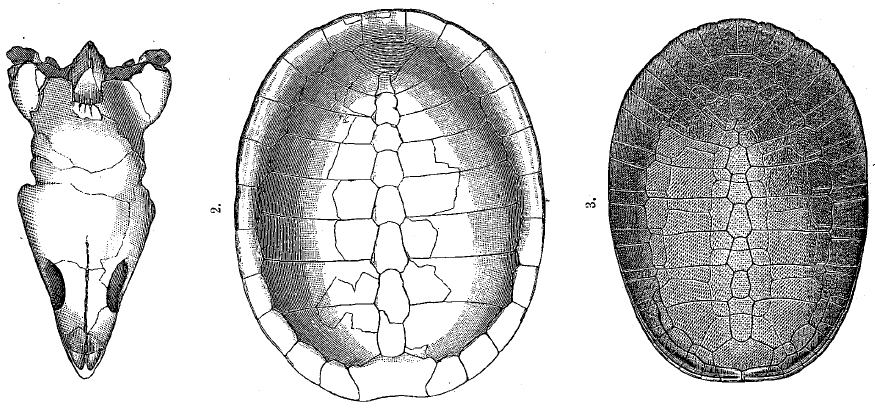
- Skull and shell of Glyptops ornatus, and shell of Adocus punctatus

Scientific classification
- Kingdom: Animalia
- Phylum: Chordata
- Class: Reptilia
- Clade: Pantestudines
- Clade: Testudinata
- Clade: †Paracryptodira
- Family: †Pleurosternidae
- Genus: †Glyptops; Marsh, 1890

Species
- Glyptops ornatus Marsh, 1890

Synonyms
- Glyptops utahensis Gaffney 1979; Glyptops plicatulus Cope, 1877

= Glyptops =

Glyptops Temporal range: Tithonian

Extinct genus of pleurosternid turtle

Glyptops is an extinct genus of pleurosternid freshwater turtle known from the Late Jurassic of North America.

== Description ==
The skull of Glyptops ornatus exhibit adaptions likely for suction feeding.

== Taxonomy ==
The type species, Glyptops plicatulus, was first described as Compsemys plicatulus by Edward Drinker Cope on the basis of AMNH 6099, a partial shell from the Late Jurassic (Tithonian) aged Morrison Formation of Colorado. In 1890, a partial skull, YPM 1784 (described from Como Bluff, Wyoming), was named Glyptops ornatus by Othniel Charles Marsh. Later, Oliver Perry Hay recognized Compsemys plicatulus and Glyptops ornatus as being from the same species, hence the new combination G. plicatulus. Another Morrison species of Glyptops, G. utahensis, was described from a complete shell (CM 3412) found at Dinosaur National Monument in Utah. Glyptops later became a wastebasket taxon to refer to isolated shell fragments with a finely sculpted surface texture. The type of Glyptops plicatulus was later judged to be a nomen dubium, due to it lacking any diagnostic characters, and Glyptops ornatus was made to be the only valid species.

The species Glytops caelatus Hay, 1908 was described from the middle Cretaceous (late Aptian-early Albian) Arundel Formation of Maryland. However, it was later dismissed as a nomen dubium based on non-diagnostic remains.
