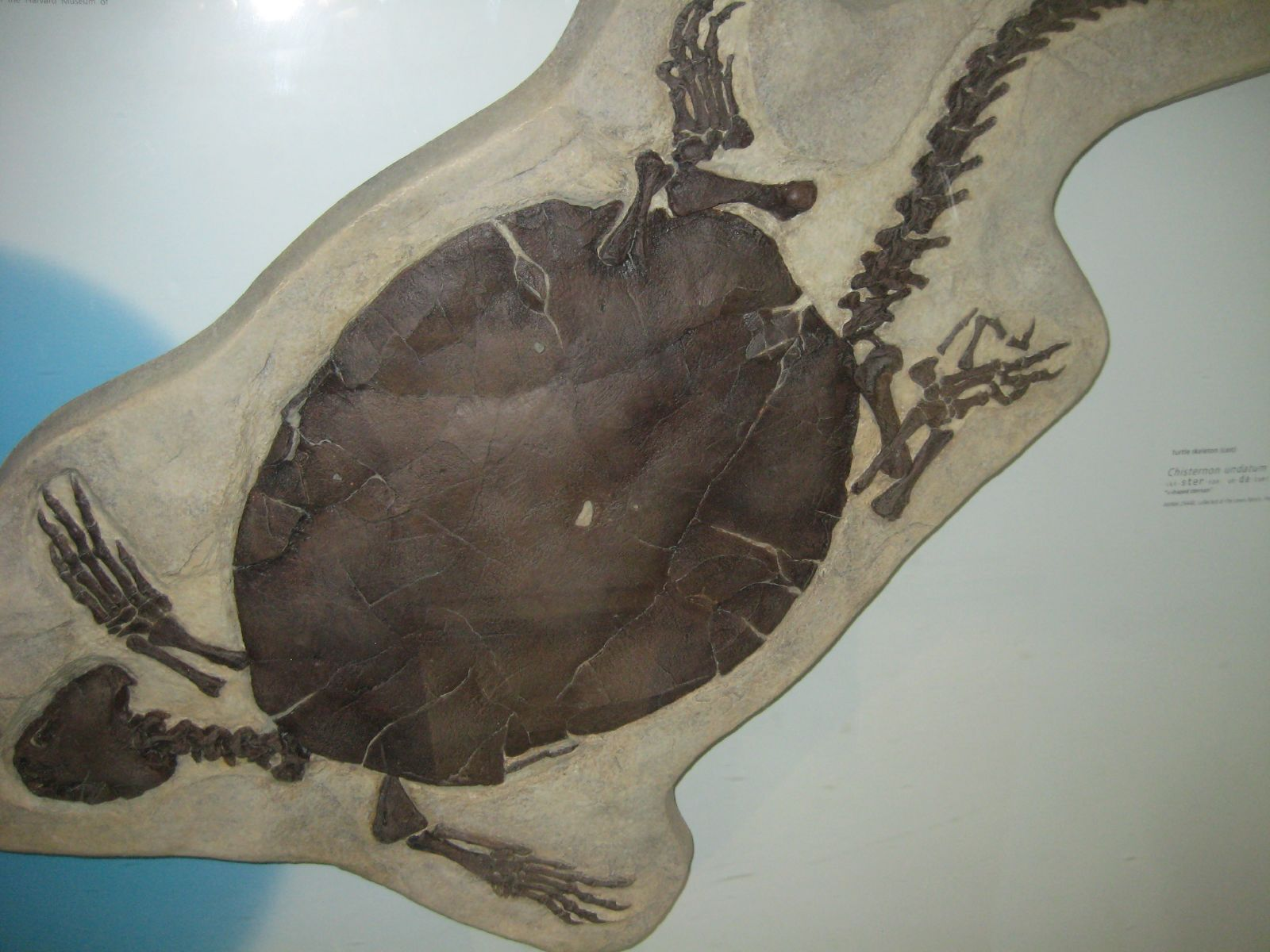
- Chisternon undatum
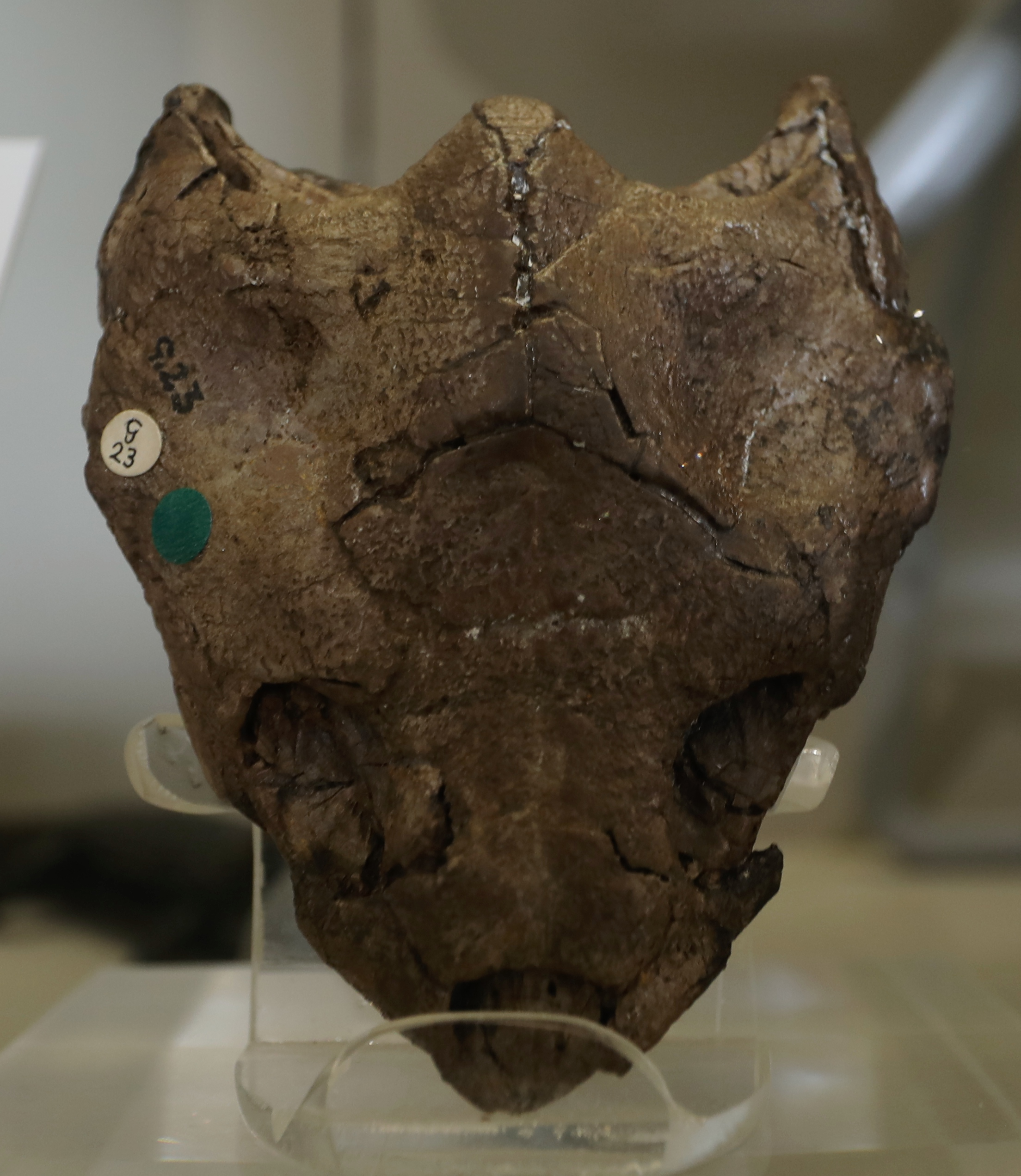
- Dorsetochelys skull

Scientific classification
- Kingdom: Animalia
- Phylum: Chordata
- Class: Reptilia
- Clade: Pantestudines
- Clade: Testudinata
- Clade: Perichelydia
- Clade: †Paracryptodira; Gaffney, 1975

Subtaxa
- See text

Synonyms
- Pleurosternoidea

= Paracryptodira =

Paracryptodires Temporal range: Late Jurassic–Eocene

Extinct clade of turtles

Paracryptodira is an extinct group of reptiles in the clade Testudinata (which contains modern turtles and their extinct relatives), known from the Jurassic to Paleogene of North America and Europe. Initially treated as a suborder sister to Cryptodira, they were then thought to be a very primitive lineage inside the Cryptodira according to the most common use of the latter taxon. They are now often regarded as late-diverging stem-turtles, lying outside the clade formed by Cryptodira and Pleurodira. Paracryptodires are divided into three main groups, Compsemydidae, known from the Late Jurassic to Paleocene of North America and Europe, Pleurosternidae, known from the Late Jurassic to Early Cretaceous of North America and Europe, and Baenidae, known from the Early Cretaceous to Eocene of North America. The latter two groups are more closely related to each other than to Compsemys, forming the clade Baenoidea.

== Characteristics ==
Paracryptodires have reduced prefrontal exposure on the dorsal surface of their skulls, reduced fenestrae perilymphaticae, and secondarily reduced supraoccipital crests. In the skull, the posterior foramen for the internal carotid canal is located midway along the basisphenoid-pterygoid suture.

== Subtaxa ==
Paracryptodira includes these taxa, after Rollot et al. (2022):

- †Compsemydidae?
- †Helochelydridae?
- †Dinochelys
- †Dorsetochelys
- †Glyptops
- †Uluops
- †Baenoidea
  - †Baenidae
  - †Pleurosternidae

Dubious species:

- †Polythorax missuriensis
- †Desmemys bertelmanni
- †Glyptops caelatus
- †Glyptops pervicax
- †Probaena sculpta

The oldest possible record of paracryptodires is from the Forest Marble Formation of England, dating to the Bathonian stage of the Middle Jurassic.

== Sources ==
- Gaffney, E.S. (1975): A phylogeny and classification of higher categories of turtles. Bulletin of the American Museum of Natural History 155(5): 387–436. PDF fulltext
- Joyce, W.G. (2007): Phylogenetic relationships of Mesozoic turtles. Bulletin of the Peabody Museum of Natural History 48(1): 3–102. DOI:10.3374/0079-032X(2007)48[3:PROMT]2.0.CO;2 HTML abstract
