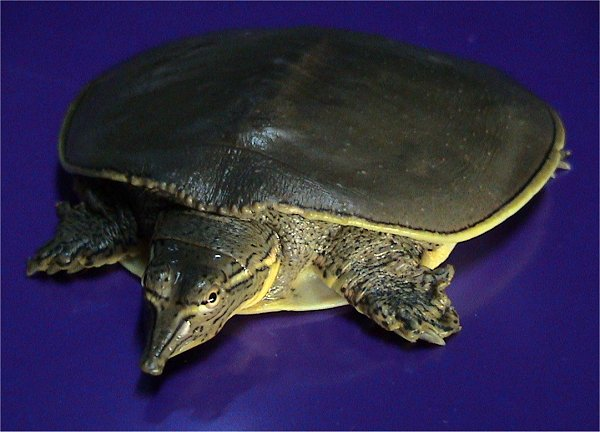
- The spiny softshell turtle (Trionychidae)
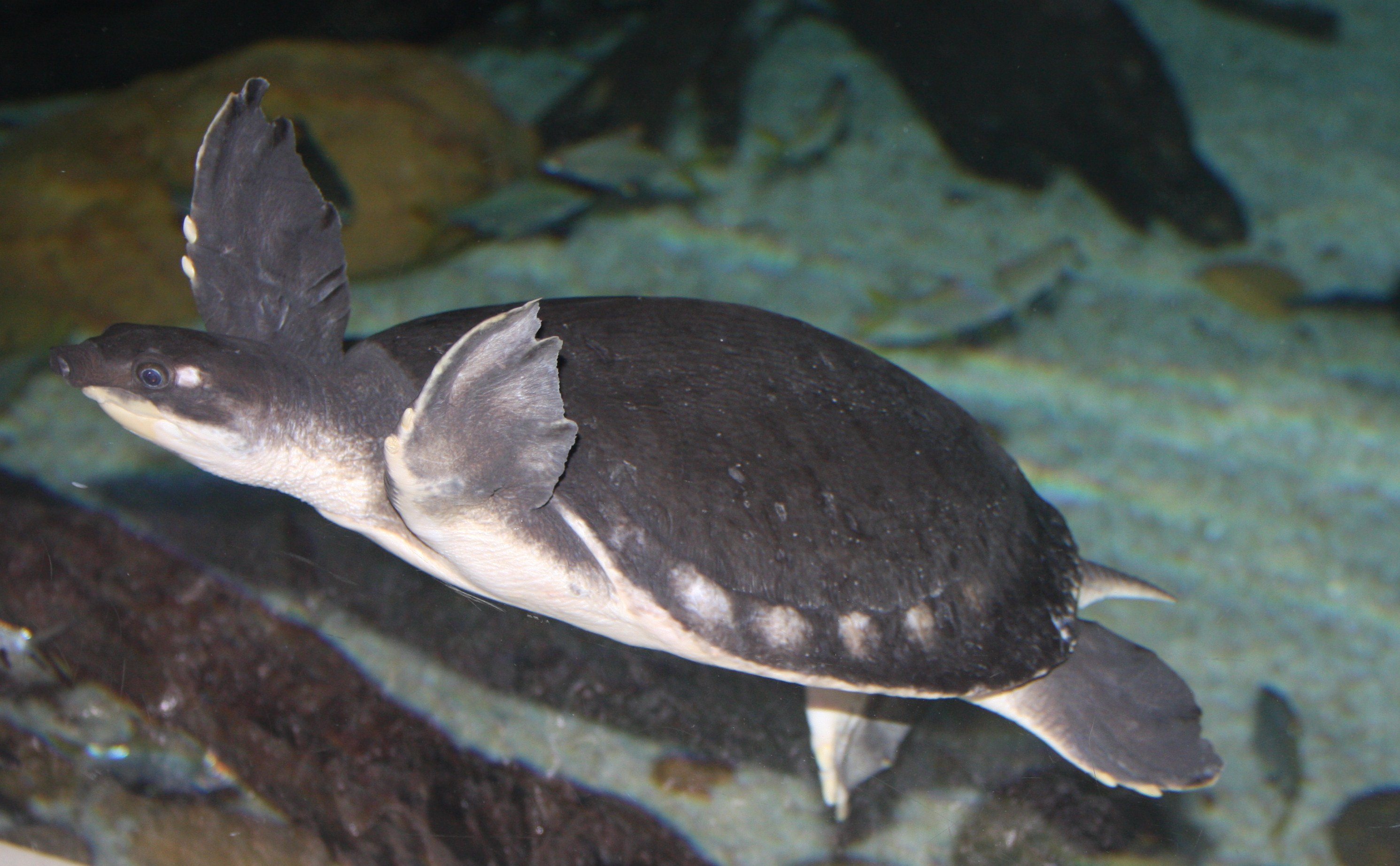
- The pig-nosed turtle (Carettochelyidae)

Scientific classification
- Kingdom: Animalia
- Phylum: Chordata
- Class: Reptilia
- Order: Testudines
- Suborder: Cryptodira
- Clade: Polycryptodira
- Superfamily: Trionychia; Hummel, 1929

Families
- Carettochelyidae; Trionychidae and see text

Synonyms
- Trionychoidea

= Trionychia =

Trionychia Temporal range: Late Jurassic to recent, 161.2–0 Ma

Superfamily of turtles

Trionychia is a superfamily of turtles which encompasses the species that are commonly referred to as softshelled turtles as well as some others. The group contains two families, Carettochelyidae, which has only one living species, the pig-nosed turtle (Carettochelys insculpta) native to New Guinea and Northern Australia, and Trionychidae, the softshelled turtles, containing numerous species native to Asia, North America and Africa. These families likely diverged during the late Jurassic. The oldest known stem-trionychian is Sinaspideretes from the Late Jurassic of China.

== Systematics ==
Except for those not assigned to a family, only living genera are listed here.

- Family Carettochelyidae
  - Subfamily Carettochelyinae
    - Genus Carettochelys
- Pan-Trionychidae
  - Family Trionychidae
    - Subfamily Cyclanorbinae
      - Genus Cyclanorbis
      - Genus Cycloderma
      - Genus Lissemys
    - Subfamily Trionychinae
      - Genus Amyda
      - Genus Apalone
      - Genus Chitra
      - Genus Dogania
      - Genus Nilssonia
      - Genus Palea
      - Genus Pelochelys
      - Genus Pelodiscus
      - Genus Rafetus
      - Genus Trionyx
    - Subfamily Plastomeninae (extinct)
      - Genus Plastomenus
      - Genus Hutchemys
      - Genus Gilmoremys
