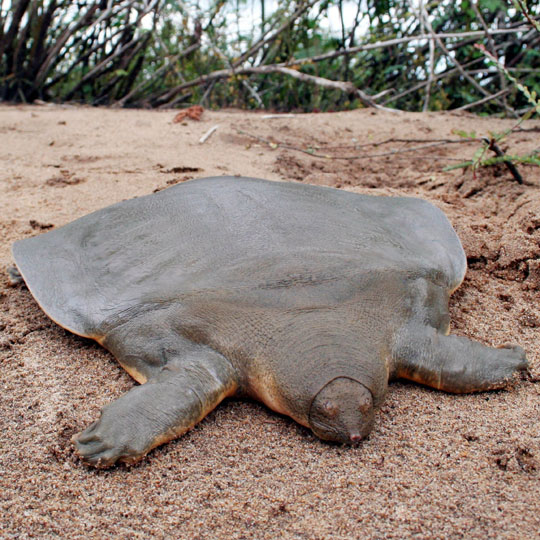
- Pelochelys cantorii

Scientific classification
- Kingdom: Animalia
- Phylum: Chordata
- Class: Reptilia
- Order: Testudines
- Suborder: Cryptodira
- Family: Trionychidae
- Subfamily: Trionychinae
- Genus: Pelochelys; Gray, 1864

Synonyms
- Pelochlys Zhao, 1997 (ex errore)

= Pelochelys =

Genus of turtles

Pelochelys is a genus of very large softshell turtles in the family Trionychidae. They are found from peninsular India northeast to southern China, and south to Southeast Asia and New Guinea. These turtles are also known as giant softshell turtles.

The species in this genus, while still being freshwater turtles as with all Trionychidae, are unique for having significant salt tolerance and regularly entering near-coastal marine habitats.

== Taxonomy ==
These three species are recognized as being valid:

- Pelochelys bibroni (Owen, 1853) – southern New Guinea giant softshell turtle
- Pelochelys cantorii Gray, 1864 – Cantor's giant softshell turtle
- Pelochelys signifera Webb, 2002 – northern New Guinea giant softshell turtle

Nota bene: In the above list, a binomial authority in parentheses indicates that the species was originally described in a genus other than Pelochelys.

Cladogram as drawn by Walter G. Joyce, Ariel Revan, Tyler R. Lyson, and Igor G. Danilov (2009)

- Trionychidae
  - - Cyclanorbinae
      - Cyclanorbis
      - - Cycloderma
        - Lissemys
    - †Plastomeninae
      - Hutchemys
      - Plastomenus
  - Trionychinae
    - - - Trionyx
        - - Chitra
          - Pelochelys
      - - Apalone
        - Rafetus
    - - - Amyda
        - Aspideretes
        - Nilssonia
      - - Dogania
        - Palea
        - Pelodiscus
