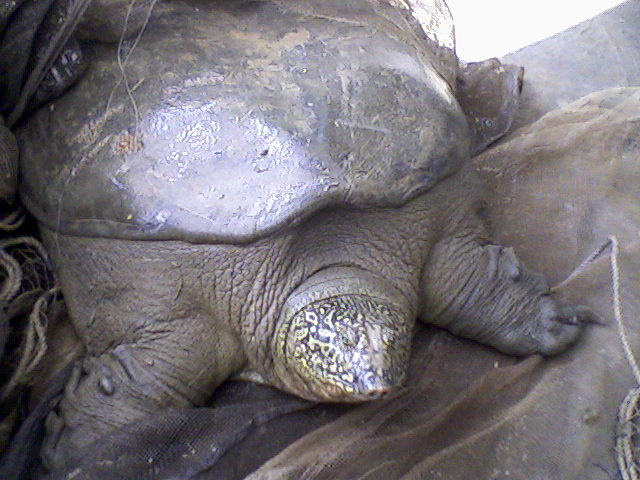
- Rafetus swinhoei in Hanoi, Vietnam
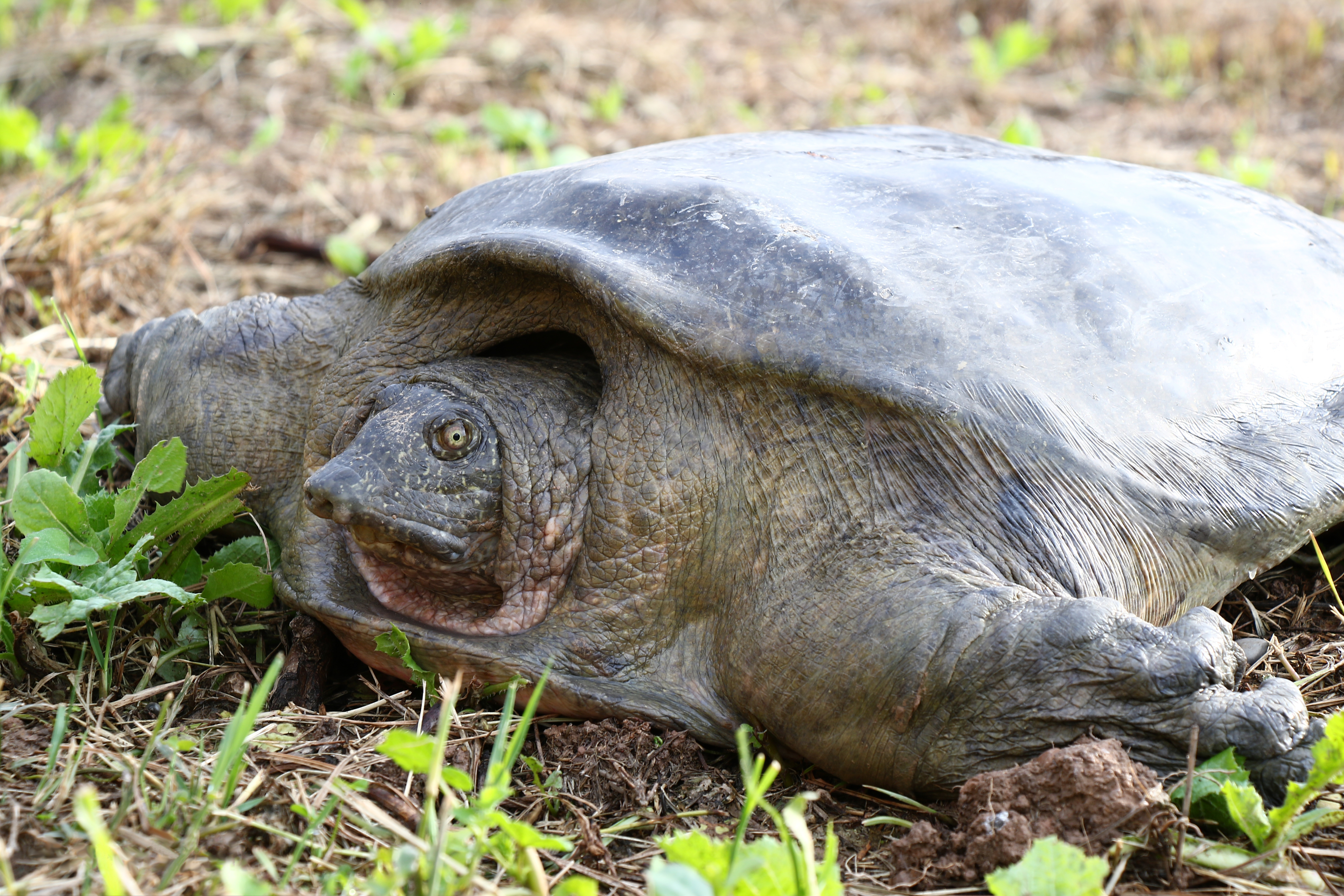
- Rafetus euphraticus

Scientific classification
- Kingdom: Animalia
- Phylum: Chordata
- Class: Reptilia
- Order: Testudines
- Suborder: Cryptodira
- Family: Trionychidae
- Subfamily: Trionychinae
- Genus: Rafetus; Gray, 1864

Type species
- Testudo euphratica Daudin, 1801

Species
- R. euphraticus (Daudin, 1801); R. swinhoei (Gray, 1873); †R. bohemicus (Liebus, 1930); †R. lysoni Joyce et al. 2026

= Rafetus =

Rafetus Temporal range: 17.5–0 Ma

Genus of turtles

Rafetus is a genus of highly endangered softshell turtles in the family Trionychidae. It is a genus of large turtles which are found in freshwater habitats in Eurasia.

== Taxonomy ==
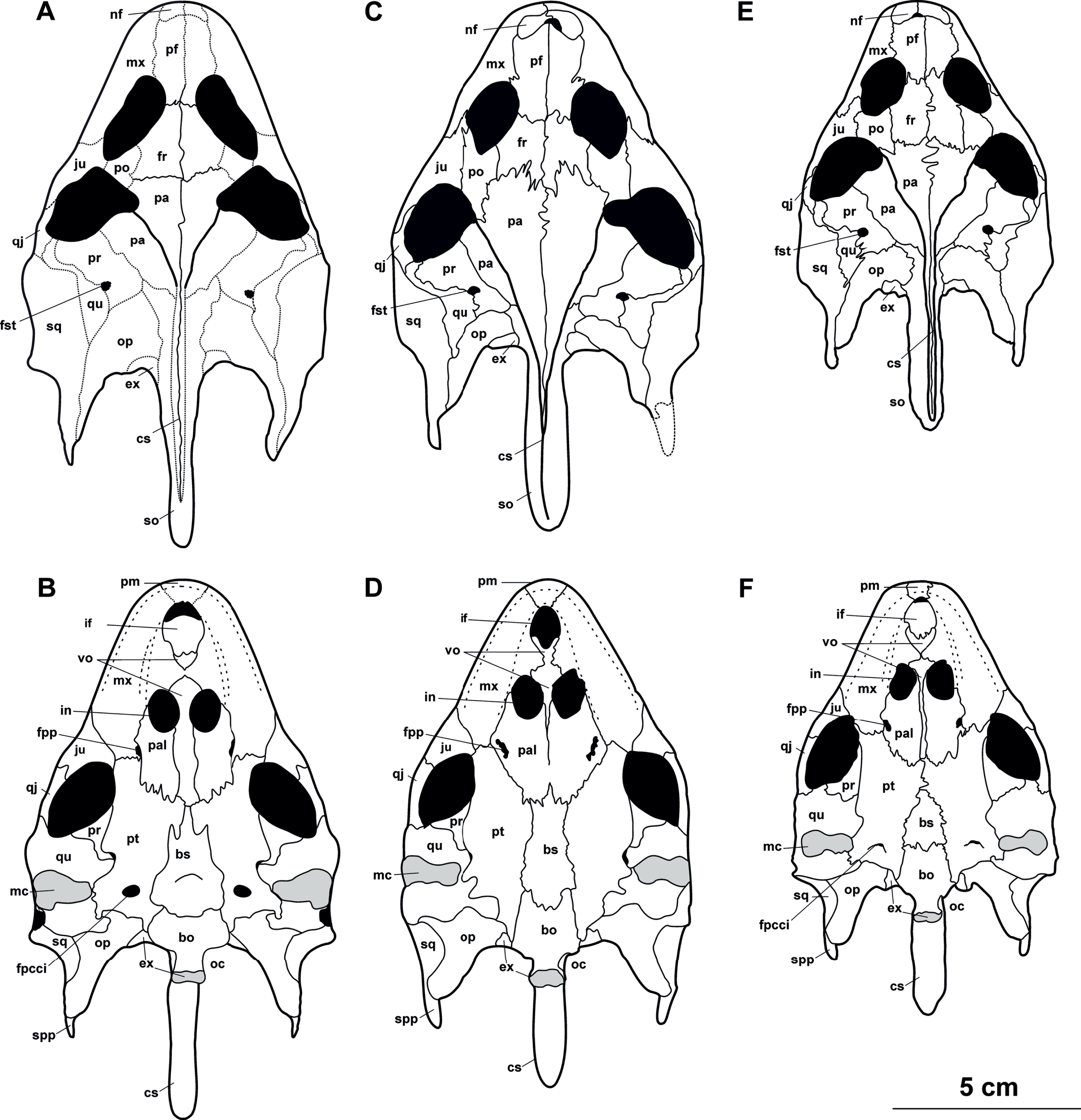
Skulls of †R. bohemicus (A-B), R. swinhoei (C-D), R. euphraticus (E-F)

=== Evolution ===
Phylogenetic evidence largely suggests that Rafetus is most closely related to the widespread North American genus Apalone. The two genera appear to have diverged during the Late Eocene, likely when the ancestors of Apalone dispersed into North America via Beringia.

=== Species ===
According to most taxonomists, the genus Rafetus contains the following two extant species.

- Rafetus euphraticus (Daudin, 1801) – Euphrates softshell turtle; Tigris and Euphrates Rivers in Iraq, Syria, Turkey, and Khūzestān Province of Iran. IUCN: Endangered.
- Rafetus swinhoei (Gray, 1873) – Yangtze giant softshell turtle; Only three known living individuals, one in Suzhou Zoo (China) and two in two lakes in northern Vietnam, Dong Mo lake and Xuan Khanh lake. IUCN: Critically endangered.

A possible third species, Rafetus leloii Hà, 2000 (synonym R. vietnamensis Le et al., 2010), known commonly as the Hoan Kiem turtle, has been proposed as a species. It is considered a junior synonym of Rafetus swinhoei by most authorities, but some Vietnamese scientists insist the two forms are not identical. The last known individual at Hoan Kiem Lake was found dead on 19 January 2016.

==== Fossil record ====
- †R. bohemicus Liebus, 1930 from the Burdigalian age of the Early Miocene (about 17.5 million years ago) lived in what is today the Czech Republic.
- †R. lysoni Joyce et al. 2026 from the Early Oligocene of North Dakota, United States (Brule Formation)

=== Phylogeny ===
Cladogram as drawn by Walter G. Joyce, Ariel Revan, Tyler R. Lyson, and Igor G. Danilov (2009)

- Trionychidae
  - - Cyclanorbinae
      - Cyclanorbis
      - - Cycloderma
        - Lissemys
    - †Plastomeninae
      - Hutchemys
      - Plastomenus
  - Trionychinae
    - - - Trionyx
        - - Chitra
          - Pelochelys
      - - Apalone
        - Rafetus
    - - - Amyda
        - Aspideretes
        - Nilssonia
      - - Dogania
        - Palea
        - Pelodiscus
