= Hutchemys =

Hutchemys Temporal range: Late Cretaceous to Late Paleocene, 70.6–55.8 Ma

Scientific classification
- Kingdom: Animalia
- Phylum: Chordata
- Class: Reptilia
- Order: Testudines
- Suborder: Cryptodira
- Family: Trionychidae
- Subfamily: †Plastomeninae
- Genus: †Hutchemys; Joyce et al., 2009

Species
- H. arctochelys Joyce et al., 2009; H. rememdium Joyce et al., 2009 (type); H. tetanetron (Hutchison, 2009); H. sterea (Hutchison, 2009); H. acupictus (Hay, 1907); H. walkerorum Jasinski et al. 2022

Synonyms
- Plastomenoides Hutchison, 2009; Derrisemys Hutchison, 2009; Plastomenus acupictus Hay, 1907; Aspideretes? nassau; Paleotrionyx? nassau; Trionyx nassau; "Plastomenine" type A

Extinct genus of turtles

Hutchemys is an extinct genus of softshell turtles from the late Cretaceous (Maastrichtian stage) to the late Paleocene of New Mexico, Montana, Wyoming, Utah, and North Dakota, United States. It was first named by Walter G. Joyce, Ariel Revan, Tyler R. Lyson and Igor G. Danilov in 2009, and the type species is Hutchemys rememdium. H. rememdium is known from the holotype YPM PU 16795, which consists of a nearly complete postcranial skeleton, and from the referred specimen YPM PU 16781, found in the Ekalaka Member of the Fort Union Formation, Montana. Another referred specimen, YPM PU 14985, was found in the Cedar Point Quarry, Wyoming. The second species, H. arctochelys, is known from the holotype YPM PU 16319, a nearly complete carapace, and from the paratypes YPM PU 16320, YPM PU 16321, YPM PU 16322, YPM PU 16238. All specimens of H. arctochelys were recovered from the same quarry of the Tongue River Member, Fort Union Formation, near Burns Mine of Montana. A possible third species is represented by the unnamed specimen UCMP 130000 from the Paleocene Tullock Formation of Montana. Aspideretes? nassau (YPM PU 11566) from the Fort Union Formation, Duffy's Ranch of Sweet Grass County, Montana was also assigned to Hutchemys sp. A fourth species of Hutchemys, Hutchemys walkerorum, has been uncovered from the Hell Creek Formation of North Dakota. H. walkerorum is known from the holotype BDM 063, identified by the discovery and assembly of portions of its carapace. The fossil of H. walkerorum suggests that it was the only Hutchemys to live exclusively during the late Cretaceous era.

The generic name honors John Howard Hutchison, a turtle paleontologist. Hutchison himself named later in 2009 two new genera of extinct softshell turtles from New Mexico, Montana, Wyoming and Utah: Plastomenoides (two new species: P. lamberti (type) and P. tetanetron) and Derrisemys (new species: D. sterea (type) and new combination D. acupictus [originally Plastomenus]). In 2011, Joyce and Lyson noted that P. lamberti and Hutchemys rememdium are based on the same type specimen (YPM PU 16795) and therefore P. lamberti and Plastomenoides are objective junior synonyms of H. rememdium and Hutchemys. P. tetanetron Hutchison, 2009 is also cogeneric with H. rememdium. They also found that D. sterea is the closest relative of P. tetanetron and therefore both D. sterea and D. acupictus were reassigned to Hutchemys.

== Phylogeny ==
Cladogram after Joyce, Revan, Lyson and Danilov, 2009:

- Trionychidae
  - - Cyclanorbinae
      - Cyclanorbis
      - - Cycloderma
        - Lissemys
    - †Plastomeninae
      - Hutchemys
      - Plastomenus
  - Trionychinae
    - - - Trionyx
        - - Chitra
          - Pelochelys
      - - Apalone
        - Rafetus
    - - - Amyda
        - Aspideretes
        - Nilssonia
      - - Dogania
        - Palea
        - Pelodiscus

Cladogram after Joyce and Lyson, 2011:

- Trionychidae
  - Trionychinae
  - - Cyclanorbinae
    - †Plastomeninae
      - Gilmoremys
      - - Plastomenus
        - Hutchemys
          - - H. rememdium
            - H. arctochelys
          - - H. tetanetron
            - H. sterea
