= Nemegtemys =

Nemegtemys Temporal range: Maastrichtian

Scientific classification
- Kingdom: Animalia
- Phylum: Chordata
- Class: Reptilia
- Order: Testudines
- Suborder: Cryptodira
- Family: Trionychidae
- Genus: †Nemegtemys
- Species: †N. conflata

Binomial name
- †Nemegtemys conflata Danilov et al., 2014

Extinct genus of reptiles

Nemegtemys is an extinct genus of cyclanorbine trionychid that lived during the Late Cretaceous epoch.

== Distribution ==
Fossils of N. conflata are known from the Nemegt Formation, a geologic formation in Mongolia dating to the Maastrichtian stage.
