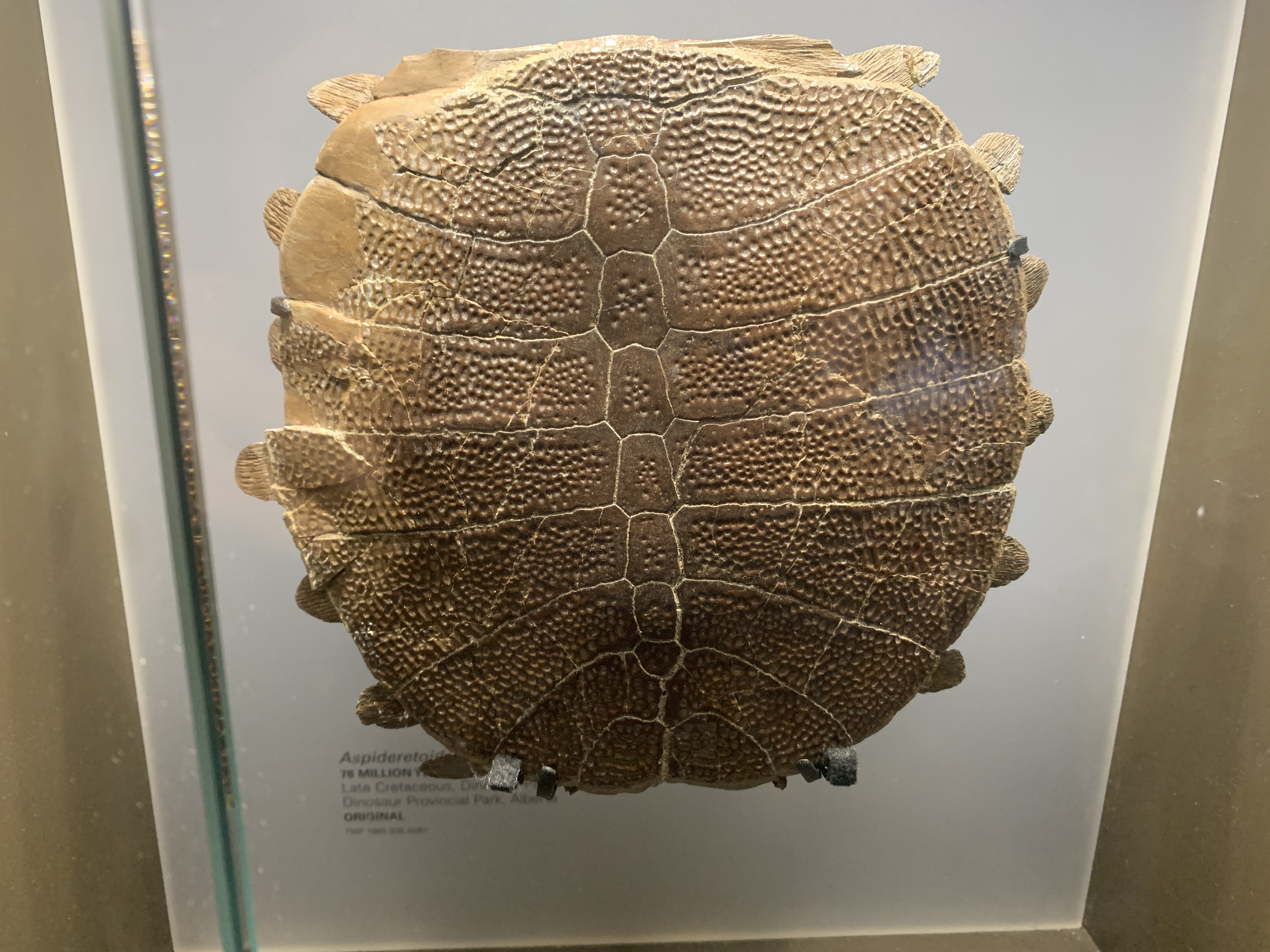
- A. foveatus specimen TMP 1985.36.87 at the Royal Tyrrell Museum

Scientific classification
- Kingdom: Animalia
- Phylum: Chordata
- Class: Reptilia
- Order: Testudines
- Suborder: Cryptodira
- Family: Trionychidae
- Subfamily: †Plastomeninae
- Genus: †Aspideretoides; Gardner et al., 1995

Species
- A. foveatus (Leidy, 1856); A. splendidus (Hay, 1908); A. allani (Gilmore, 1923)

Synonyms
- A. foveatus: Trionyx foveatus Leidy, 1856; Aspideretes foveatus Hay, 1908; Aspideretes subquadratus Lambe, 1914; Aspideretes maturus Lambe, 1914; Trionyx maturus Hummel, 1929; Trionyx subquadratus Hummel, 1929; Aspideretes rugosus Parks, 1933; Trionyx rugosus Kuhn, 1964; A. splendidus: Aspideretes splendidus Hay, 1908; Aspideretes granifer Hay, 1909; Trionyx splendidus Hummel, 1929; Trionyx granifer Hummel, 1929; Aspideretes planus Parks, 1933; Trionyx planoides Kuhn, 1964; A. allani: Aspideretes allani Gilmore, 1923; Trionyx allani Hummel, 1929

= Aspideretoides =

Aspideretoides Temporal range: Late Cretaceous, Campanian–Maastrichtian

Extinct genus of turtles

Aspideretoides is an extinct genus of soft-shelled turtle from the Late Cretaceous of North America.

== Naming and description ==
The genus was named in 1995 by James D. Gardner and colleagues to unite multiple species that had at times been referred to the genera Aspideretes or Trionyx, all from the Judith River Group or similar strata. The type species, A. foveatus, was originally named as a species of Trionyx by Joseph Leidy in 1856, with the type specimen being a partial carapace and plastron, but referred specimens covering all regions of the skeleton as well as the skull. It is known definitively from the Judith River Formation and equivalent strata, the Two Medicine Formation, and probably the Hell Creek Formation, with unsubstantiated reports of A. foveatus suggest it may have lived beyond the end of the Cretaceous into the Paleocene or even Eocene. The second species, A. splendidus, was originally named as a species of Aspideretes by Oliver Hay in 1908 for an incomplete carapace, but is now also known from complete carapaces, plastrons, and skulls from the Judithian of Montana and Alberta. The third species, A. allani, was originally named by Charles W. Gilmore in 1923 as a species of Aspideretes known from a nearly complete skeleton and skull, with additional referred elements. It is only known from the Dinosaur Park Formation. The three species can be distinguished by multiple features of the carapace, plastron, and jaws.

== Taxonomy ==
While it was originally considered a member of Trionychinae, phylogenetic analysis suggests that Aspideretoides may be closer to Plastomeninae, which is either a subfamily within Trionychidae or a family within Trionychoidea depending on classification scheme.

- Plastomenidae/Plastomeninae
  - Aspideretoides foveatus
  - Atoposemys
  - - Gilmoremys gettyspherensis
    - Gilmoremys lancensis
    - Plastomeninae/Plastomenini
