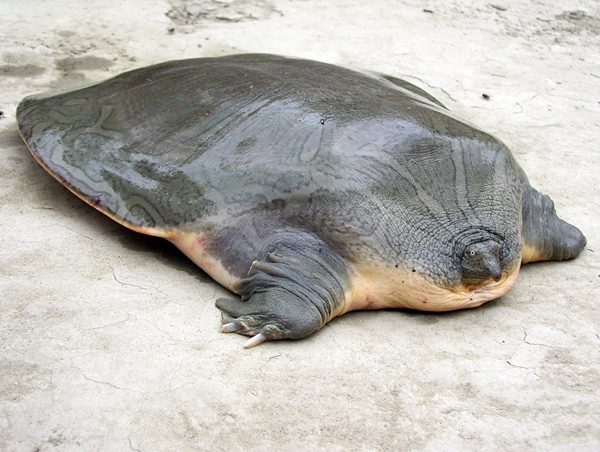

Conservation status
- Endangered (IUCN 2.3)
- CITES Appendix II

Scientific classification
- Kingdom: Animalia
- Phylum: Chordata
- Class: Reptilia
- Order: Testudines
- Suborder: Cryptodira
- Family: Trionychidae
- Genus: Chitra
- Species: C. indica

Binomial name
- Chitra indica (Gray, 1831)

Synonyms
- Trionyx indicus Gray, 1831; Gymnopus lineatus A.M.C. Duméril & Bibron, 1835; Chitra indica — Gray, 1844; Gymnopus indicus —Cantor, 1847; Testudo chitra Buchanan-Hamilton, 1831 (nomen nudum); Trionyx lineatus — Martens, 1876; Aspidonectes indicus — Hay, 1904

= Indian narrow-headed softshell turtle =

Species of turtle

The Indian narrow-headed softshell turtle (Chitra indica), also known commonly as the small-headed softshell turtle and the Indo-Gangetic softshell turtle, is an endangered species of softshell turtle in the family Trionychidae. The species is native to waterways and rivers of the Indian subcontinent. One of the largest freshwater turtles, it feeds on fish, frogs, worms, crustaceans and molluscs, and even the occasional swimming rodent or other small mammal. C. indica, like other softshell turtles, uses it flexible and leathery shell to dig itself deep into sandy lake and river bottoms; here, it patiently waits, with just its nose, mouth and eyes exposed, for potential prey to swim by. It will also ambush and chase its prey, depending on availability, the time of year, and size of the prey. In the past it was included as a subspecies of Chitra chitra, a species restricted to Southeast Asia using current taxonomy.

== Diagnostic characters ==
Chitra indica is very large with a straight-line carapace length of up to 1.1 m (3.6 ft).

1. Overall color: olive to deep olive-green;
2. Very complex midline (vertebral) carapacial pattern;
3. Midline (vertebral) carapacial stripe present;
4. Complex radiating costal stripes;
5. Paramedian neck stripes forming a bell-like pattern on anterior carapace absent;
6. Neck stripes do not form a continuous light rim around carapace;
7. No distinct pair of neck stripes;
8. Dark speckling on "light" (head and neck) stripes;
9. Anterior neck "V" divergence point on neck;
10. 3-4 forelimb lamellae;
11. No peri-orbital X pattern;
12. No distinct peri-orbital ocelli;
13. No distinct naso-orbital triangular "figure";
14. Few, if any, black dots present on chin pattern.

Type locality: "India, fl. Ganges, Penang"; restricted by Smith (1931:162) to "Fatehgarh, Ganges," India = "India: Ganges; Futtaghur" (Gray 1864: 92)

== Geographic distribution ==
Chitra indica is found in the Sutlej and Indus river basins of Pakistan, and Ganges, Godavari, Mahanadi and other rivers basins of India, Nepal and Bangladesh. Although widespread, it occurs in low densities, even within protected areas. It is threatened by hunting and habitat loss. It prefers clear, large or medium rivers with sandy bottoms. It spends most of time concealed below the sand, sometimes with only the tip of the nose exposed.

== Eating habits ==
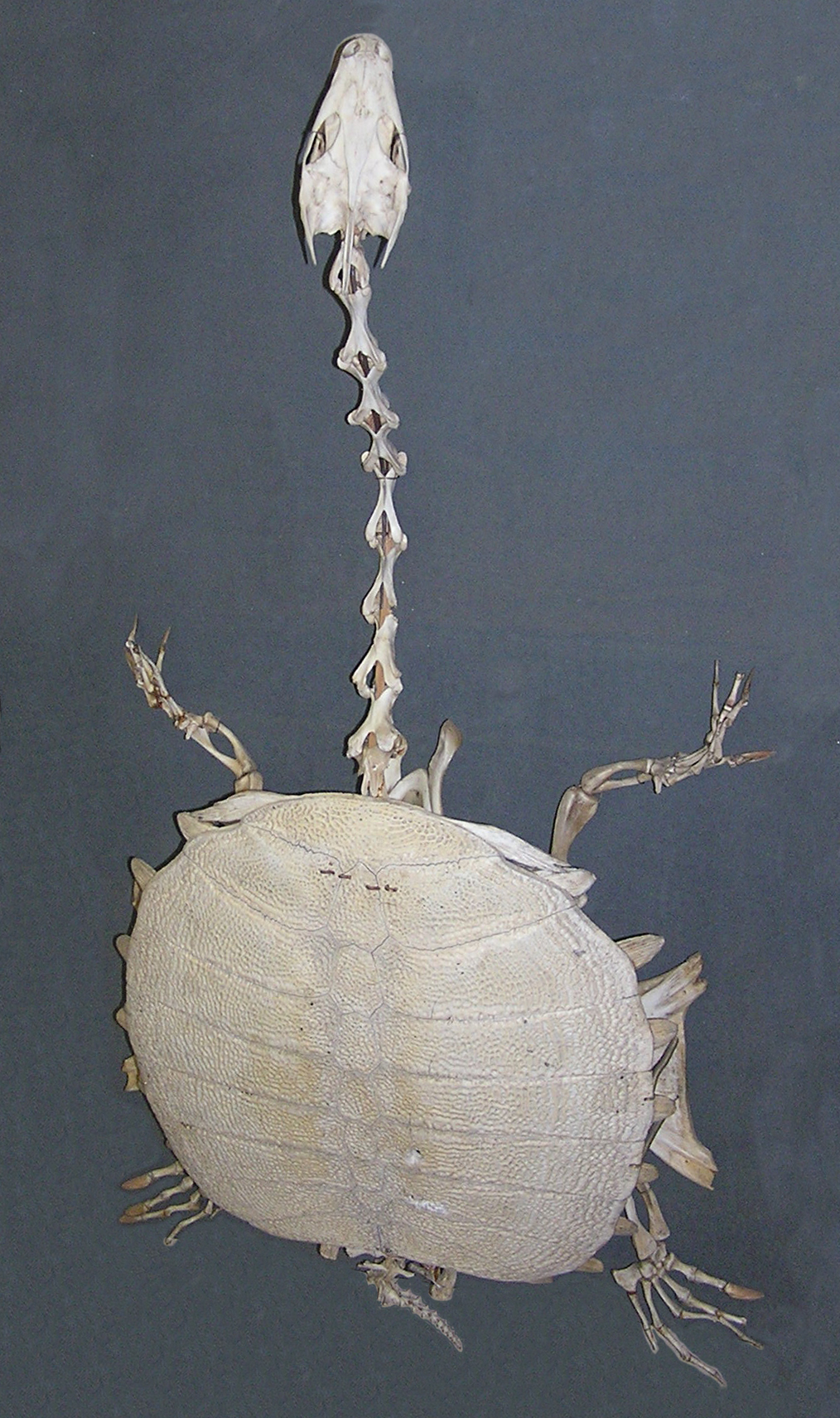
Skeletal proof of long neck

Buried in sand, the Indian narrow-headed softshell turtle waits for its prey to come into its reach. When this happens, the turtle's head extends out of its shell at a high velocity in order to grab and then eat the prey. In a 2009 video from Animal Planet's show River Monsters, this turtle is seen quickly extending its head and long retractable neck out of its shell.

== Conservation ==
The Nepali government has established a turtle breeding center in Chitwan National Park and granted permission to a non-governmental organization to rescue and conserve Chitra indica in eastern Nepal. Despite this, and the turtle's status as an endangered species, it is not on the Nepali government's list of highly protected wildlife. Conservationists have claimed the Nepali government's actions do not go far enough in protecting the turtle from natural and anthropogenic threats, such as increased flooding due to the worsening of monsoons caused by climate change, damming of rivers, and gravel mining.

In 2022, after two decades of breeding attempts, 41 newborn turtles hatched at the San Diego Zoo.

=== Threats ===
Chitra indica is often caught by humans, both as bycatch and for consumption, as turtle meat and eggs are considered a delicacy.
