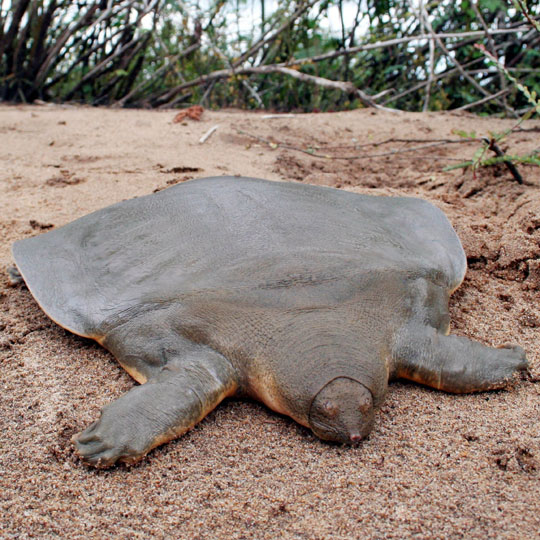

Conservation status
- Critically Endangered (IUCN 3.1)
- CITES Appendix II

Scientific classification
- Kingdom: Animalia
- Phylum: Chordata
- Class: Reptilia
- Order: Testudines
- Suborder: Cryptodira
- Family: Trionychidae
- Genus: Pelochelys
- Species: P. cantorii

Binomial name
- Pelochelys cantorii Gray, 1864
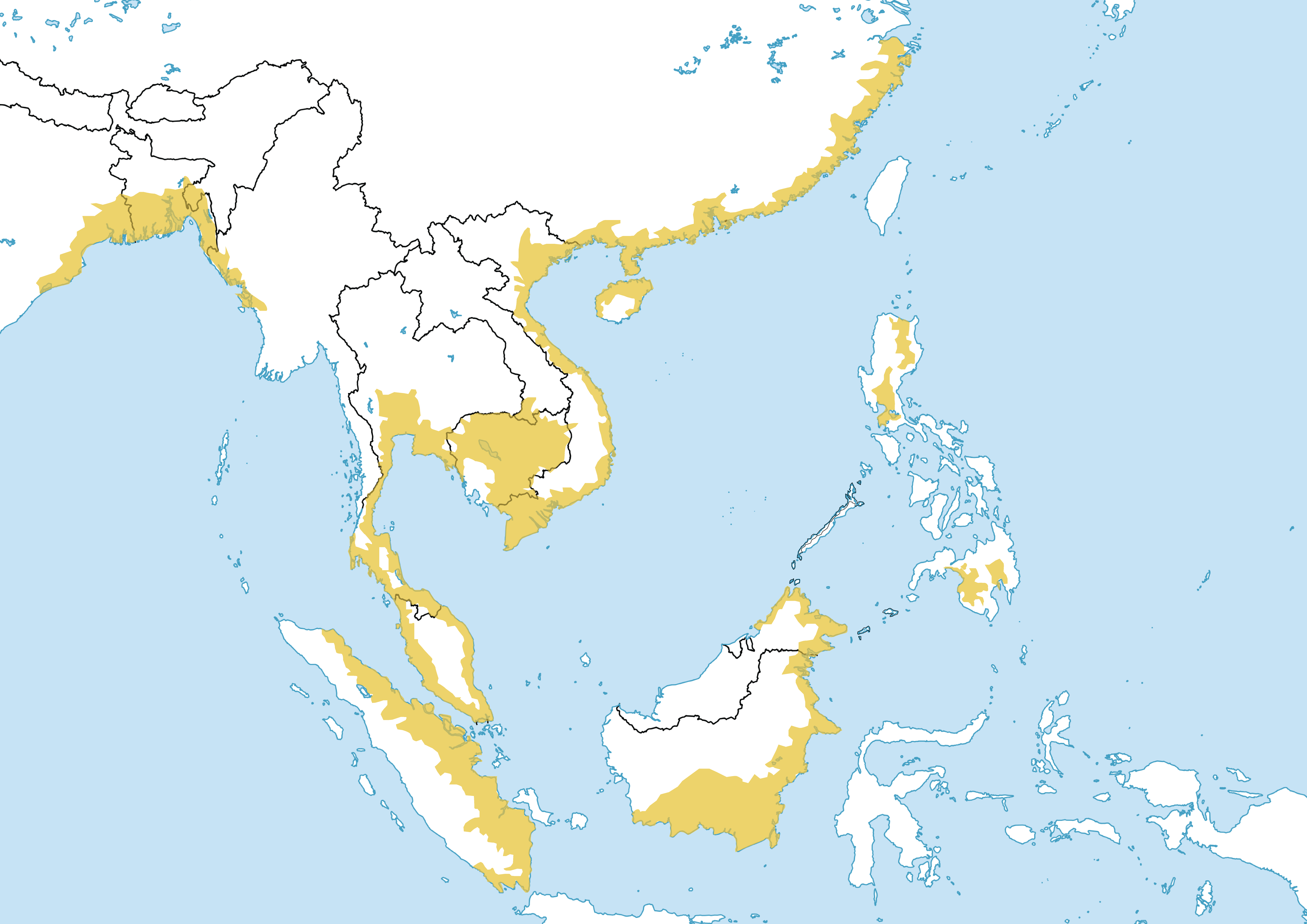
- Range

Synonyms
- List: Pelochelys cantorii Gray, 1864; Pelochelys cumingii Gray, 1864; Pelochelys cantoris Boulenger, 1889; Pelochelys poljakowii Strauch, 1890; Pelochelys cummingii M.A. Smith, 1931 (ex errore); Pelochelys cantori Pritchard, 1967 (ex errore)

= Asian giant softshell turtle =

Species of freshwater turtle

The Asian giant softshell turtle (Pelochelys cantorii), also known commonly as Cantor's giant softshell turtle and the frog-faced softshell turtle, is a species of freshwater turtle in the family Trionychidae. The species is native to Southeast Asia. The species is critically endangered and in the 20th century has disappeared from much of its former range.

== Taxonomy ==
P. cantorii is not found in New Guinea, while the two other members of the genus Pelochelys, P. bibroni and P. signifera are both restricted to New Guinea. P. cantorii is relatively unstudied, and the current species may actually be composed of several taxa. One study from 1995 showed that what was once thought to be P. cantorii in New Guinea was actually P. bibroni, and the earlier studies of P. cantorii only described populations farther to the west. A genome study revealed that several genes related to tumor resistance, growth, and aging were more active in P. cantorii. The genes found were VWA5A, ABCG2, A2M, and IGSF1. They are related to tumor resistance, growth, and aging. P. cantorii fits into turtle evolution because P. cantorii became separate from its closest turtle relatives about 59 million years ago. Turtles split from the common ancestor of birds and crocodiles around 256 million years ago.

The populations of Asian giant softshell turtles in the Philippines "may be distinct" based on genetic analysis, implying the possibility of unique genetic traits in this population. More research is needed to confirm if the critically-endangered Philippine population is a distinct species.

== Description ==
The Asian giant softshell turtle has a broad head, and small eyes close to the tip of its snout. The carapace is smooth and olive-colored. Juveniles may have dark-spotted carapaces and heads, with yellow around the carapace.

Despite reports that it can grow up to 1.8 metres (5.9 ft) in length and is the world's largest extant freshwater turtle, this maximum size and title is murky at best. Apparently the largest specimen carapace length, 129 cm (51 in), known is considered suspect and the heaviest specimen known (weighing approximately 250 kg (550 lb) was actually a misidentified Yangtze giant softshell turtle. A more realistic range of carapace length for this species is reportedly 70 to 100 cm (28 to 39 in) and it is one of about a half-dozen giant softshell turtles from three genera that reach exceptionally large sizes, i.e. in excess of 100 kg (220 lb) in mass.

== Behavior and reproduction ==
P. cantorii is an ambush predator and primarily carnivorous, feeding on crustaceans, mollusks and fish (although some aquatic plants may also be eaten). The turtle spends 95% of its life buried and motionless, with only its eyes and mouth protruding from the sand. It surfaces only twice a day to take a breath, and lays 20–28 eggs sized around 3.0 to 3.6 centimetres (1.2 to 1.4 in) in diameter in February or March on riverbanks.

== Morphological variation ==
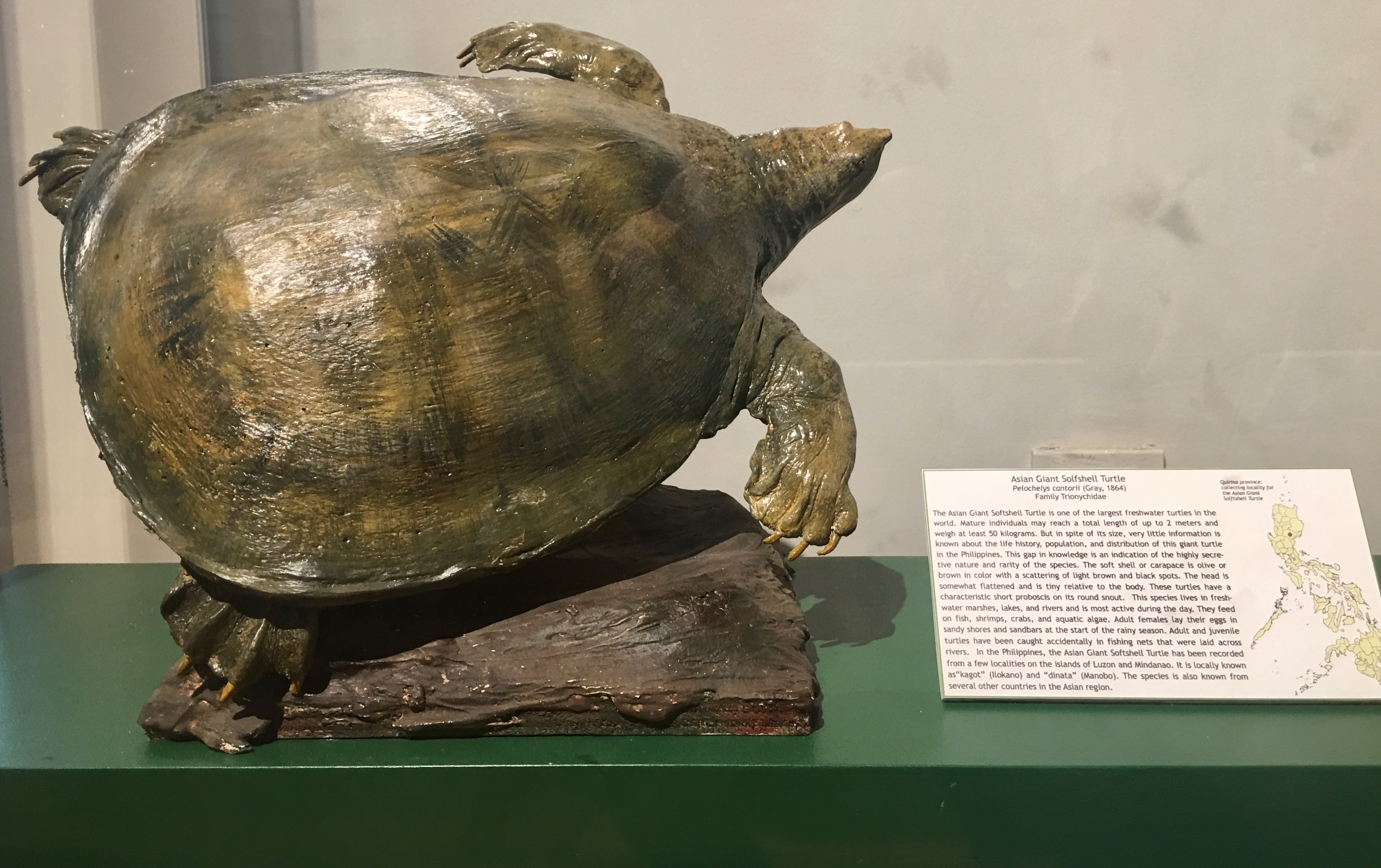
Asian giant softshell turtle at the Philippine National Museum

Morphological differences in neural bone count have been noted between specimens of P. cantori found in the Philippines and specimens found in mainland Asia.

== Etymology ==
The specific name, cantorii, is in honor of Danish zoologist Theodore Edward Cantor. Additionally, they are named for their softshells because they have soft, leathery shells that are completely devoid of scales.

== Geographic range and habitat ==
The species P. cantorii is primarily found in inland, slow-moving, freshwater rivers and streams. Some evidence indicates that its range extends to coastal areas, as well. It occurs in eastern and southern India, Bangladesh, Burma, Thailand, Malaysia, Laos, Cambodia, Vietnam, eastern and southern China, the Philippines (Luzon and Mindanao), and Indonesia (Kalimantan, Java, and Sumatra).

== Conservation ==
The Asian giant softshell turtle is classified as a Critically Endangered by the IUCN and has been forced out through habitat destruction, disappearing from much of its range. Prior to 2007, it was last seen in Cambodia in 2003. A 2007 survey of one area of the Mekong River in Cambodia found the turtle in abundance along a 48 kilometres (30 mi) stretch of the river.

In the Philippines, a juvenile Cantor's turtle known as "cagot" appeared and was captured by a fisherman along the Addalam River in Cabarroguis, Quirino. In 2001, this turtle was sent to Chicago and its identity confirmed. The geographic range of the turtle was initially murky in the Philippines, but recent studies have confirmed their range in at least two islands, Luzon and Mindanao. However, the invasive Chinese softshell turtle has become present in these two islands due to illegal introductions from mainland China. The Department of Environment and Natural Resources lists the Asian giant softshell turtle as a protected species and its trade is illegal under Philippine law, while it allows, through specific legal processes, the culling and catching of the invasive Chinese softshell turtle for import purposes, as to reduce the number of the invasive species, especially in areas where the indigenous Asian giant softshell turtle is present. Not all locals are aware of the difference between the two species which look similar, and this has led to the illegal catching of Asian giant softshell turtles in some instances. The department has yet to resolve this key issue in the conservation of Asian giant softshell turtles in the Philippines, where genetic studies have confirmed that the Philippine populations have distinct features from other populations in Asia.

The reptile has been evaluated as an EDGE species by the Zoological Society of London.
