= Gilmoremys =

Gilmoremys Temporal range: Upper Cretaceous, Maastrichtian

Scientific classification
- Kingdom: Animalia
- Phylum: Chordata
- Class: Reptilia
- Order: Testudines
- Suborder: Cryptodira
- Family: Trionychidae
- Subfamily: †Plastomeninae
- Genus: †Gilmoremys; Joyce & Lyson, 2011

Species
- †G. lancensis (Gilmore, 1928) [originally Aspideretes lancensis] (type); †G. gettyspherensis Joyce, Lyson, and Sertich, 2018

Extinct genus of turtles

Gilmoremys is an extinct genus of softshell turtle which lived during the late Cretaceous (Maastrichtian stage) of North Dakota, Montana and Wyoming, United States.

== Remains ==
Gilmoremys is known from five skulls, a mandible and an incomplete postcranial skeleton. The holotype of G. lancensis, USNM 6727, consists of a nearly complete carapace and an isolated hyoplastral fragment, was first assigned to the species Aspideretes lancensis. Many additional specimens were later discovered including cranial remains, and the material was assigned to its own genus, Gilmoremys. It was found from the Hell Creek Formation and from the Lance Formation (only the holotype). It was first named by Walter G. Joyce and Tyler R. Lyson in 2011 and the type species is Gilmoremys lancensis. The generic name honors Dr. Charles W. Gilmore. A second species, G. gettyspherensis, is known from the late Campanian Fruitland Formation of New Mexico.

== Morphology ==
Juveniles of this species have narrow skulls, a narrow processus trochlearis oticum, a deep and narrow median palatal groove, low accessory ridges, and a secondary palate fully formed by the maxilla, skeletally mature individuals have notably broad skulls, a broad processus trochlearis oticum, a shallow but broad median palatal groove, high accessory ridges, and a substantial contribution of the vomer to the secondary palate. Two large trionychid skulls and isolated shell pieces have been discovered in deposits of the Hell Creek Formation exposed in Carter County, Montana, southeastern Montana. The skulls are noticeably larger than those previously discovered and differ in their overall form by being significantly broader. Detailed analysis reveals that the new skulls and shell fragments correspond with changes in overall form representing an ontogenetic shift towards the adult morphology of this species.

== Phylogeny ==
Cladogram after Joyce & Lyson, 2011:

- Trionychidae
  - Trionychinae
  - - Cyclanorbinae
    - Plastomeninae
      - Gilmoremys
      - - Plastomenus
        - Hutchemys
          - - H. rememdium
            - H. arctochelys
          - - H. tetanetron
            - H. sterea
