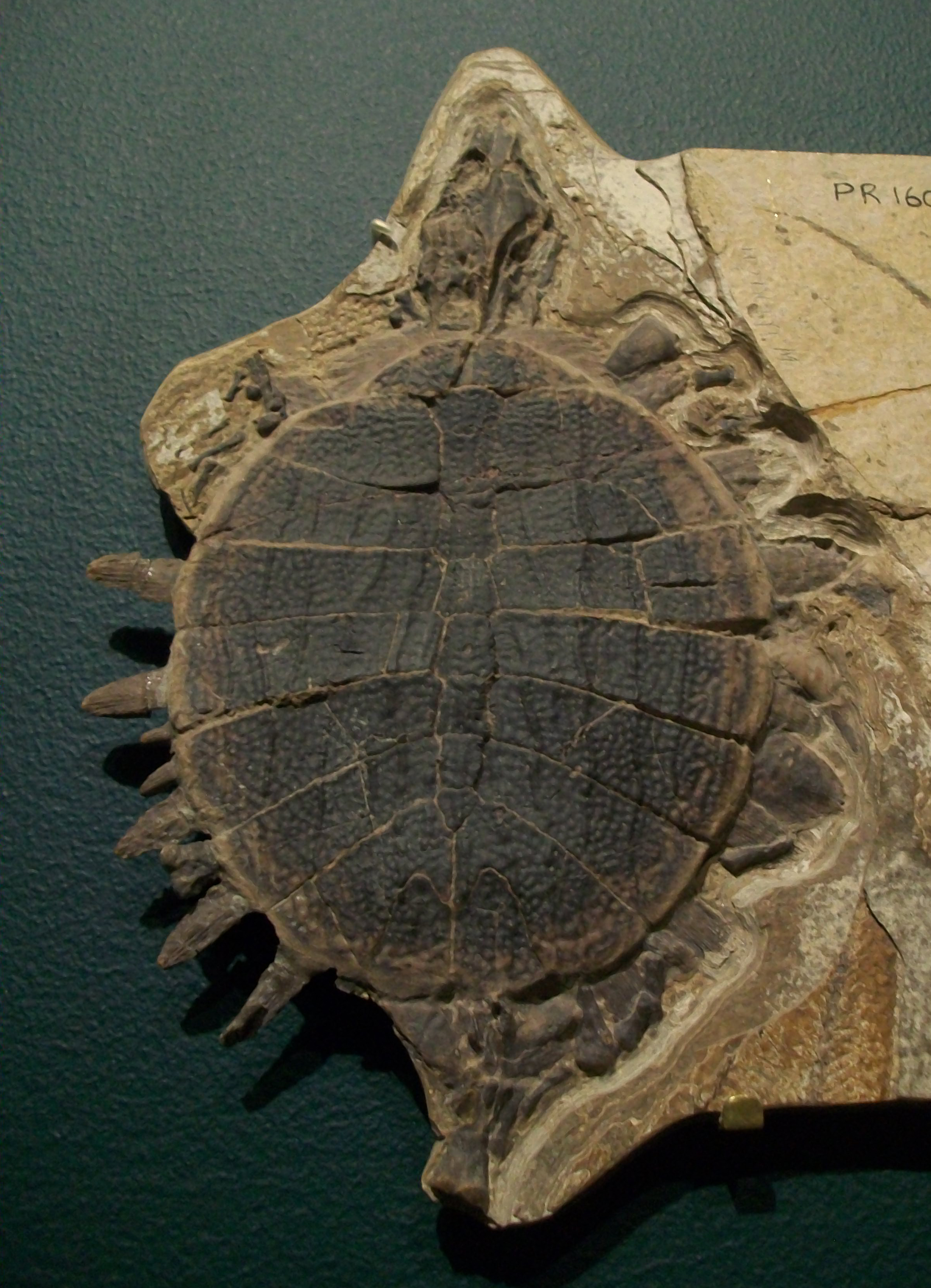
- Fossil in the Field Museum of Natural History.

Scientific classification
- Kingdom: Animalia
- Phylum: Chordata
- Class: Reptilia
- Order: Testudines
- Suborder: Cryptodira
- Family: Trionychidae
- Subfamily: †Plastomeninae
- Genus: †Plastomenus; Cope, 1873

Type species
- †Trionyx thomasii Cope, 1872

Species
- †P. joycei Lyson, Petermann & Miller, 2021; †P. thomasii (Cope, 1872); †P. vegetus (Gilmore, 1919)

= Plastomenus =

Plastomenus Temporal range: Early Paleocene to Lutetian

Extinct genus of softshell turtle from the Cretaceous and Eocene

Plastomenus is an extinct genus of turtle that inhabited western North America during the early Paleogene period.

== Evolution ==
Plastomenus belongs to the clade Pantrionychidae, represented by softshell turtles in modern times. It is the type genus of the subfamily Plastomeninae (also treated as the family Plastomenidae), a group of extinct turtles that lived from the Late Cretaceous to the Eocene. The type species, P. thomasii, was first described by Edward Drinker Cope in 1872.

The following species are known:

- †P. joycei Lyson, Petermann & Miller, 2021 - Early Paleocene of Colorado, USA (Denver Formation)
- †P. thomasii (Cope, 1872) - Early to Middle Eocene (Ypresian to Lutetian) of Wyoming, USA (Bridger Formation)
- †P. vegetus (Gilmore, 1919) - Early Paleocene of New Mexico, USA (Nacimiento Formation)

Many other species formerly placed in this genus, from both North America and Asia, have been reclassified into other genera, synonymized with one of the extinct species, or are now considered nomina dubia.

=== Phylogeny ===
Based on Joyce & Lyson (2017):

- Plastomeninae
  - Aspideretoides
  - - Atoposemys
    - - Gilmoremys
      - Plastomenini
        - Helopanoplia
        - - Hutchemys
          - - Plastomenus

Alternatively, Plastomenus may be most closely related to Gilmoremys.

== Description ==
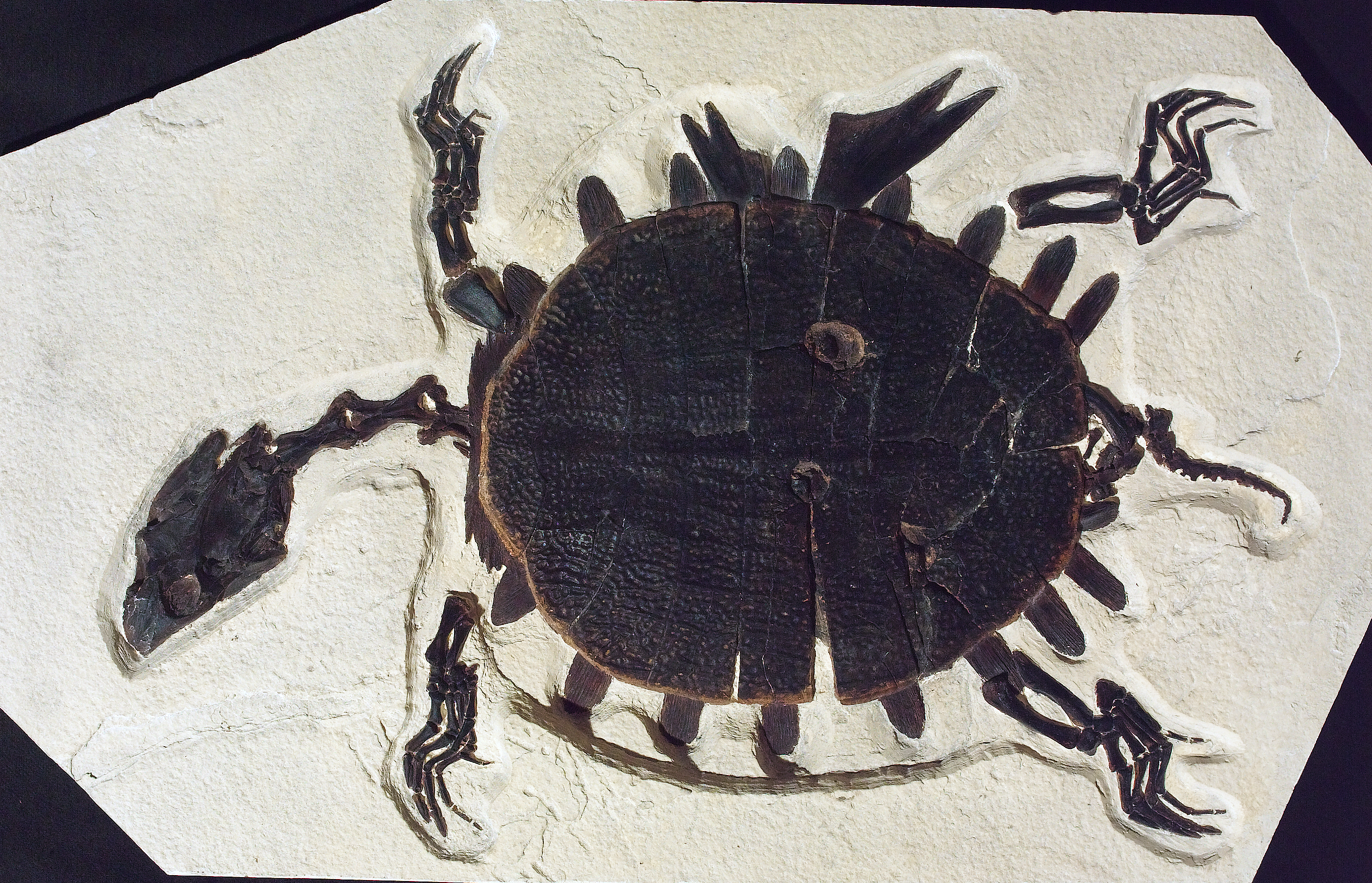
A cast of †Plastomenus thomasii with bite marks. The shell is approximately 14.75 cm long.

Plastomenus turtles are distinguished by their low, rounded shells and elongated skulls, which set them apart from other contemporary softshell turtles.
