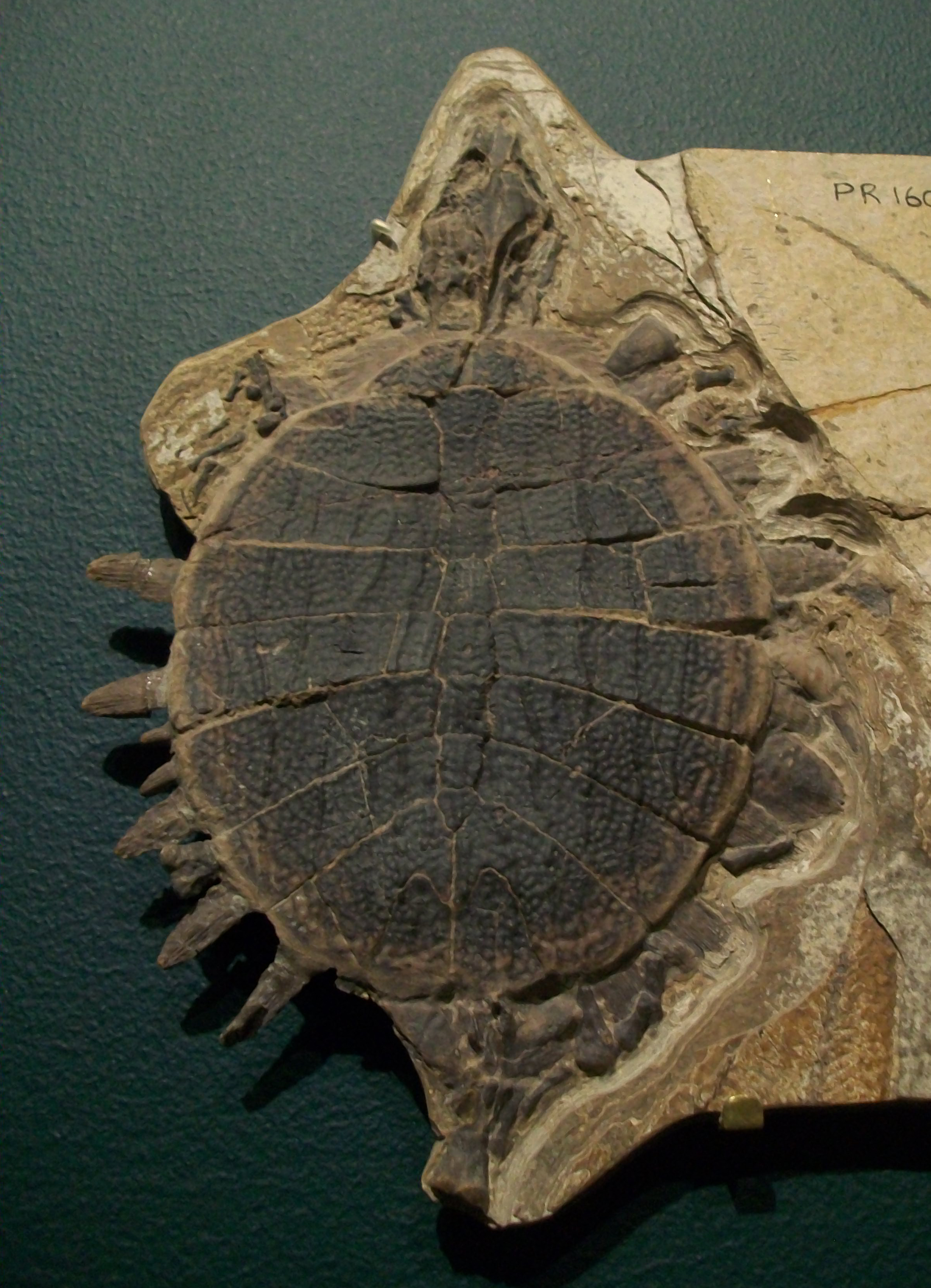
- Plastomenus sp.

Scientific classification
- Kingdom: Animalia
- Phylum: Chordata
- Class: Reptilia
- Order: Testudines
- Suborder: Cryptodira
- Family: Trionychidae
- Subfamily: †Plastomeninae; Hay, 1902

Genera
- See text

= Plastomeninae =

Plastomeninae Temporal range: Campanian– Lutetian

Extinct subfamily of turtles

Plastomeninae is an extinct subfamily of softshell turtles that inhabited most of North America from the Cretaceous to the Eocene. Members of this subfamily are also known as plastomenines.

== Taxonomy and evolution ==
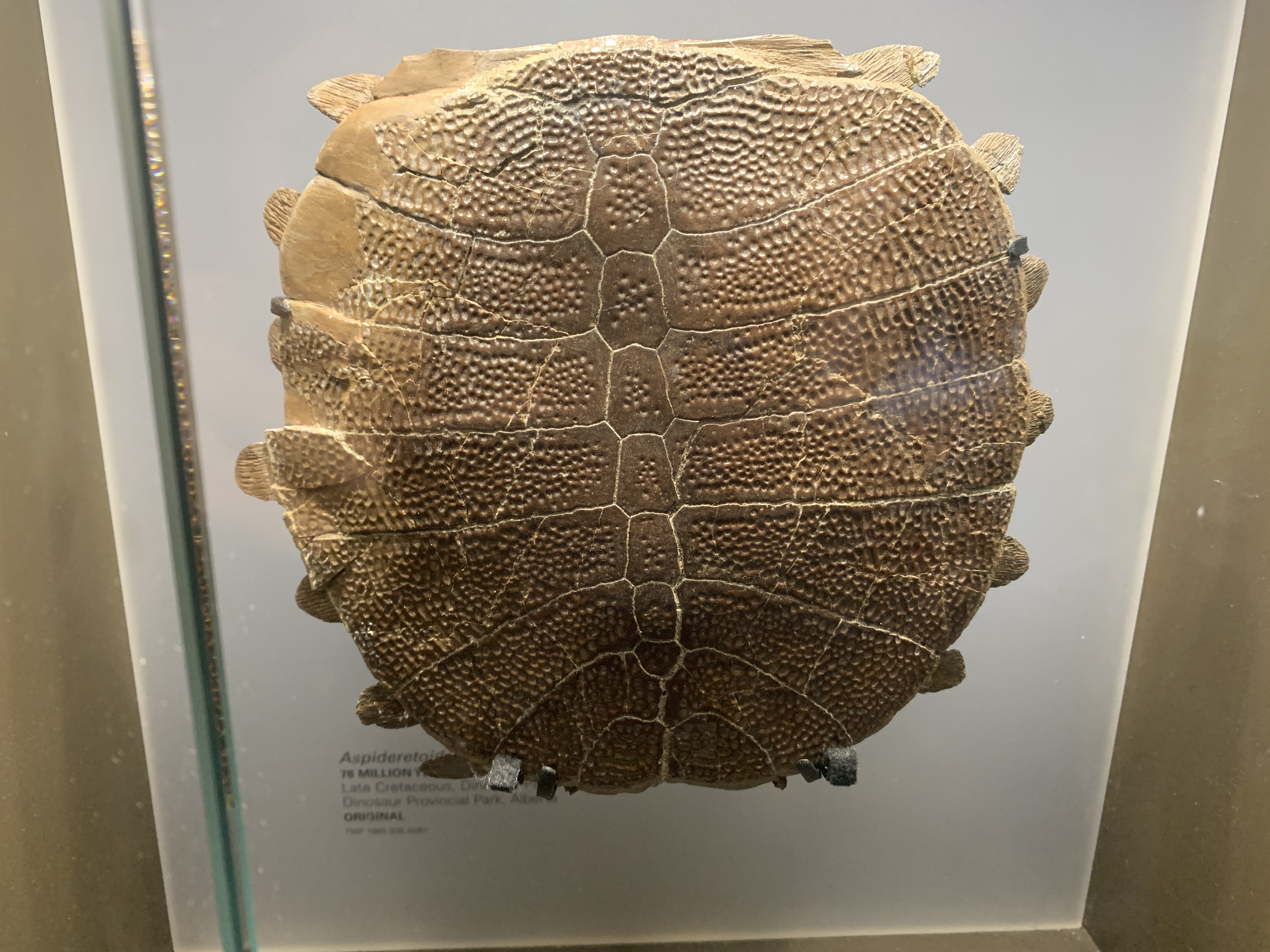
Aspideretoides foveatus TMP 1985.036.0087 (original, not cast), Dinosaur Park Formation, Dinosaur Provincial Park, Alberta. At the Royal Tyrrell Museum of Palaeontology.

They are thought to have originated in North America during or shortly before the Campanian from basal trionychids that dispersed from Asia. They reached their peak diversity from the Maastrichtian through the Paleocene, having survived the Cretaceous–Paleogene extinction event. However, they went entirely extinct by the Lutetian. The last surviving member of this subfamily is thought to have been Plastomenus thomasii, which is the only known member of the subfamily to have survived past the Paleocene into the Eocene.

Morphological analysis supports them being the sister taxon to the flapshell turtles (subfamily Cyclanorbinae), which still survive to the present day in parts of tropical Asia and Africa, in contrast to the exclusively North American plastomenines.

== Genera ==
These extinct genera are known:

- Subfamily Plastomeninae
  - †Aspideretoides
  - †Atoposemys
  - †Gilmoremys
  - Tribe Plastomenini
    - †Hutchemys
    - †Helopanoplia
    - †Plastomenus
