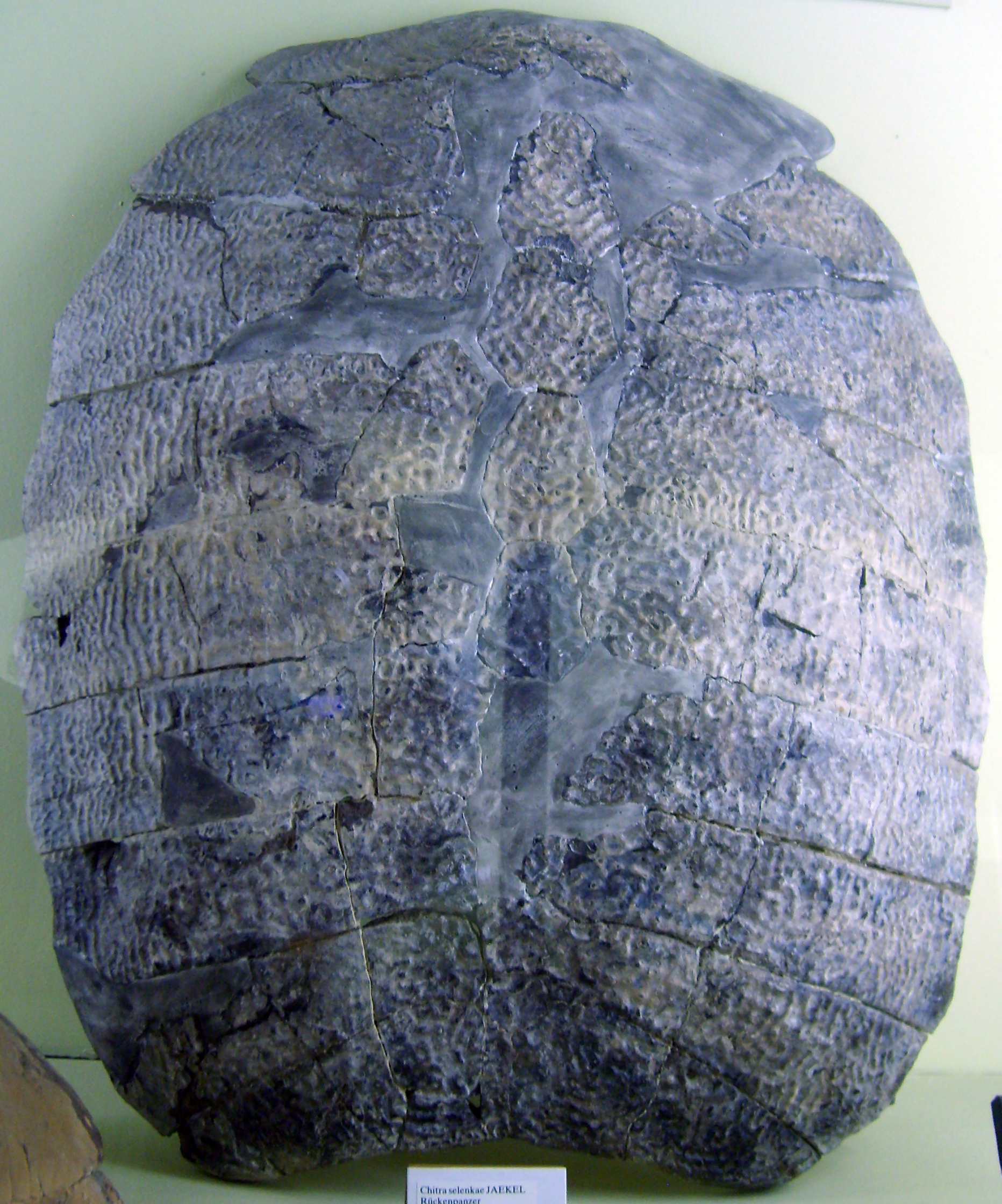
- Skeleton of a Chitra chitra shell at the Museum für Naturkunde, Berlin

Scientific classification
- Kingdom: Animalia
- Phylum: Chordata
- Class: Reptilia
- Order: Testudines
- Suborder: Cryptodira
- Family: Trionychidae
- Subfamily: Trionychinae
- Genus: Chitra; Gray, 1844

= Chitra (turtle) =

Genus of turtles

Chitra is a genus of Asian turtles in the family Trionychidae.

== Species ==
- Chitra chitra Nutaphand, 1986 – Asian narrow-headed softshell turtle
  - C. c. chitra Nutaphand, 1986 – Siamese narrow-headed softshell turtle
  - C. c. javanensis McCord & Pritchard, 2003 – Javanese narrow-headed softshell turtle
- Chitra indica (Gray, 1830) – Indian narrow-headed softshell turtle
- Chitra vandijki McCord & Pritchard, 2003 – Burmese narrow-headed softshell turtle

Nota bene: A binomial authority in parentheses indicates that the species was originally described in a genus other than Chitra.
