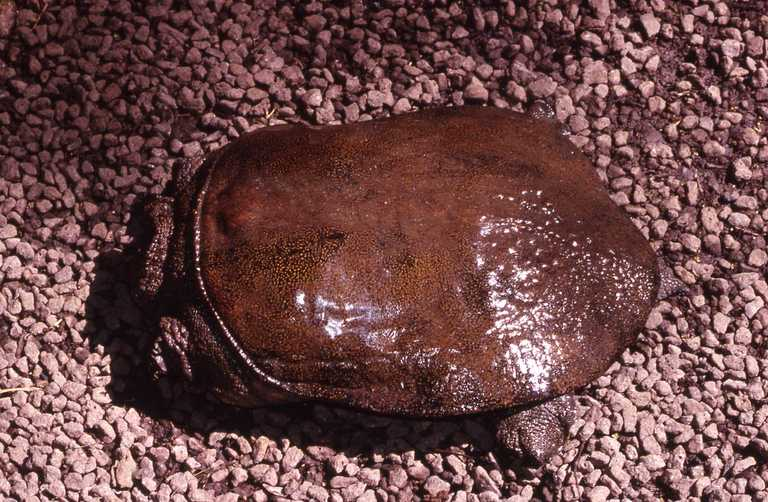

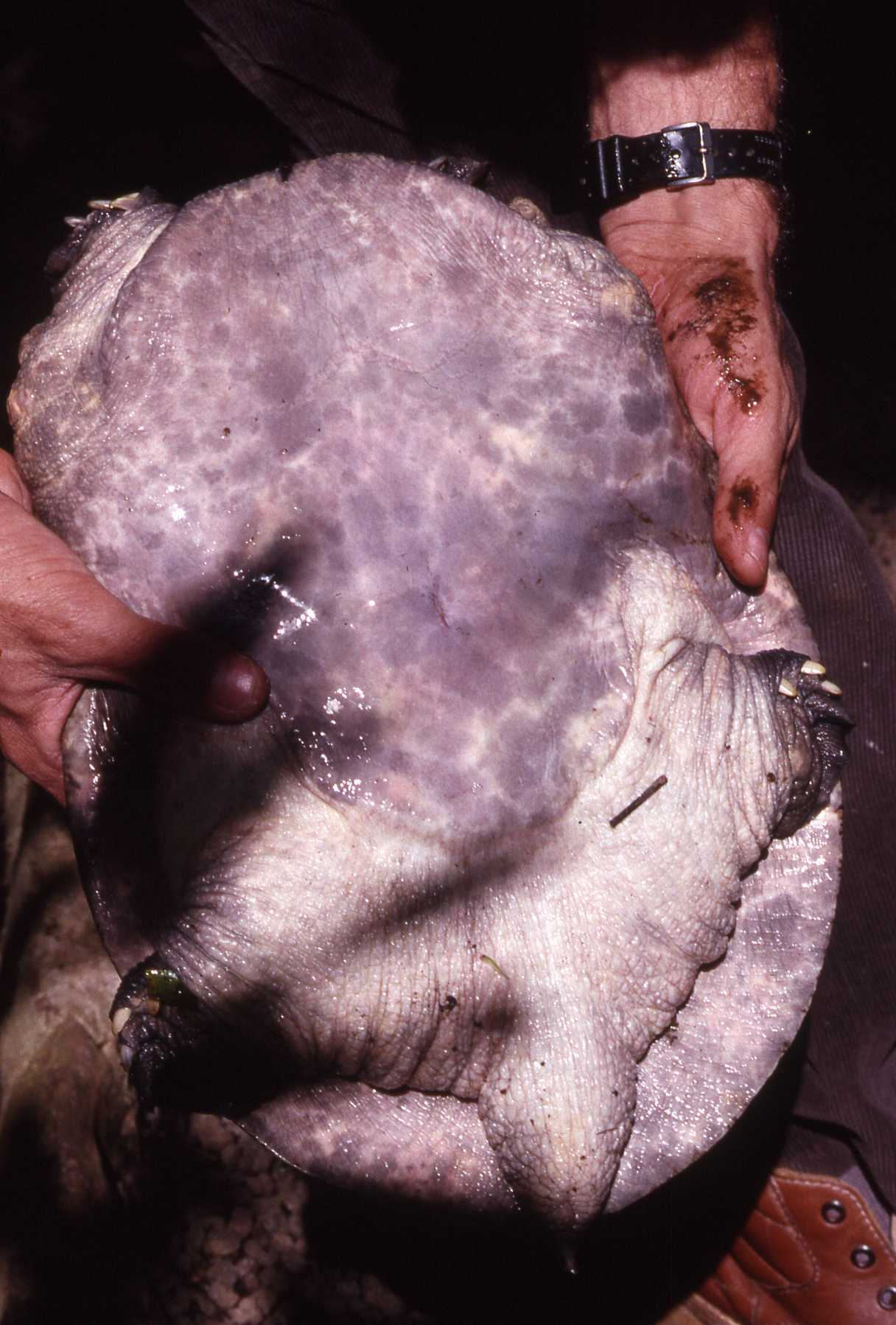

Conservation status
- Critically Endangered (IUCN 3.1)
- CITES Appendix II

Scientific classification
- Kingdom: Animalia
- Phylum: Chordata
- Class: Reptilia
- Order: Testudines
- Suborder: Cryptodira
- Family: Trionychidae
- Subfamily: Trionychinae
- Genus: Palea; Meylan, 1987
- Species: P. steindachneri

Binomial name
- Palea steindachneri (Siebenrock, 1906)

Synonyms
- List: Aspidonectes californiana Rivers, 1889 (nomen suppressum); Pelodiscus californianus — Baur, 1893; Aspidonectes californiensis [sic] O.P. Hay, 1904 (ex errore); Trionyx steindachneri Siebenrock, 1906 (nomen conservandum); Amyda steindachneri — K.P. Schmidt, 1927; Palea steindachneri — Meylan, 1987; Trionix steindachneri — Richard, 1999; Pelodiscus steindachneri — Pritchard, 2001; Palea steindachneri — Ziegler, 2002

= Wattle-necked softshell turtle =

Species of turtle

The wattle-necked softshell turtle (Palea steindachneri), also commonly known as Steindachner's soft-shelled turtle, is an endangered Asian species of softshell turtle in the family Trionychidae. The species is the only member of the genus Palea.

== Description ==
P. steindachneri exhibits sexual dimorphism. Females of this freshwater turtle reach up to 44.5 cm (17.5 in) in straight carapace length, while males only reach up to 36 cm (14 in). However, males have a longer tail than the females.

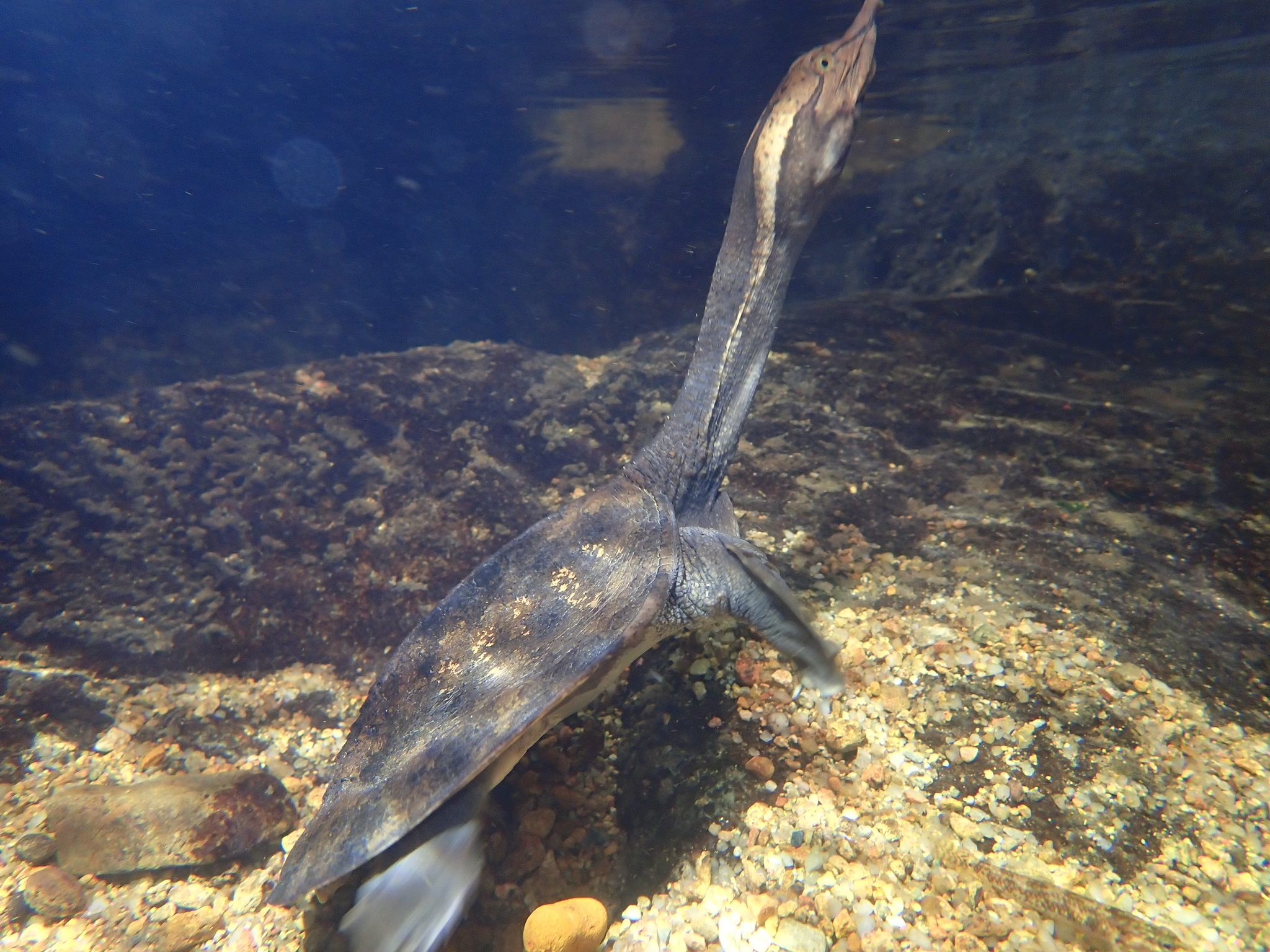
In Hong Kong

== Etymology ==
The specific name, steindachneri, is in honor of Austrian herpetologist Franz Steindachner.

== Geographic range ==
P. steindachneri is native to southeastern China (Guangdong, Guangxi, Guizhou, Hainan, Yunnan), Laos, and Vietnam, but has also been introduced to Hawaii and Mauritius.

== Threats ==
P. steindachneri is endangered by poaching for human consumption. Although pressure on the wild population continues, several thousand are hatched and raised each year on turtle farms in China and Vietnam for food and traditional medicine.
