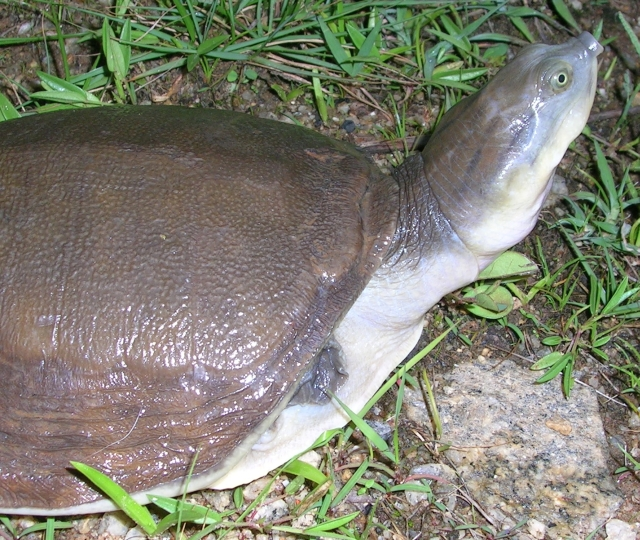
- Lissemys punctata

Scientific classification
- Kingdom: Animalia
- Phylum: Chordata
- Class: Reptilia
- Order: Testudines
- Suborder: Cryptodira
- Family: Trionychidae
- Subfamily: Cyclanorbinae
- Genus: Lissemys; M. A. Smith, 1931

Synonyms
- Emyda Gray, 1831

= Lissemys =

Lissemys Temporal range: Miocene to recent, 15.97–0 Ma

Genus of turtles

Lissemys is a genus of softshell turtles in the subfamily Cyclanorbinae of the family Trionychidae. The genus is indigenous to southern Asia.

== Species ==
The genus Lissemys contains three extant species, which are recognized as being valid:

- Lissemys ceylonensis (Gray, 1856) – Sri Lankan flapshell turtle
- Lissemys punctata (Bonnaterre, 1789) – Indian flapshell turtle
- Lissemys scutata (W. Peters, 1868) – Burmese flapshell turtle

Several extinct fossil species have been described for this genus, such as Lissemys piramensis Prasad, 1974, from Piram Island, India, but these are largely considered nomen dubia. However, the extant Indian flapshell turtle (L. punctata) is known from fossils from as early as the Miocene.

Nota bene: A binomial authority in parentheses indicates that the species was originally described in a genus other than Lissemys.
