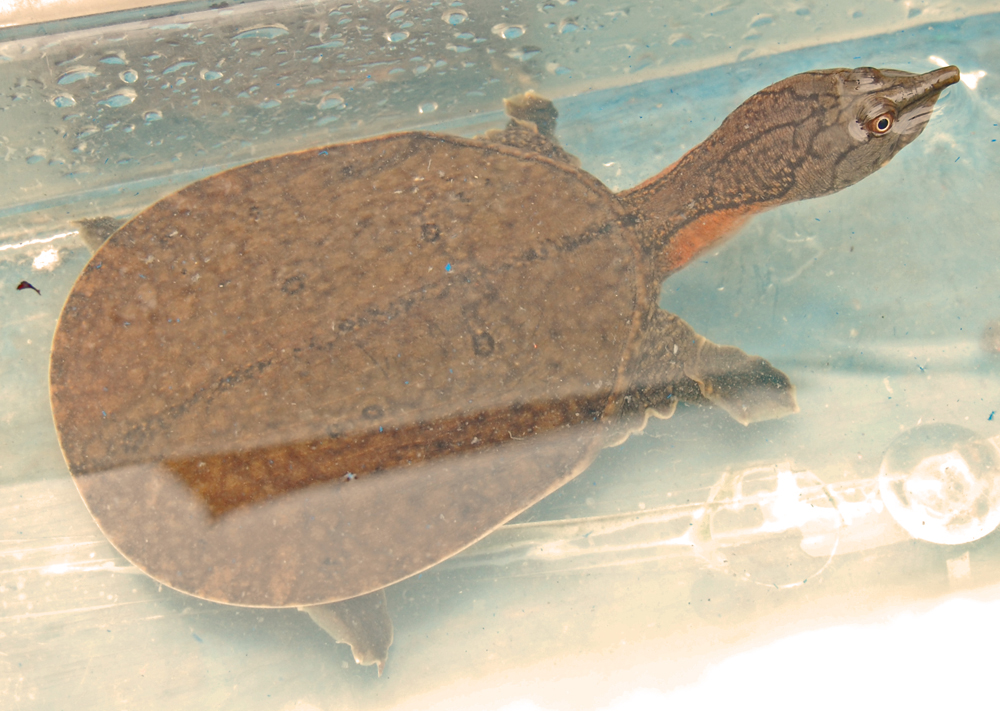
- Dogania subplana from Bogor
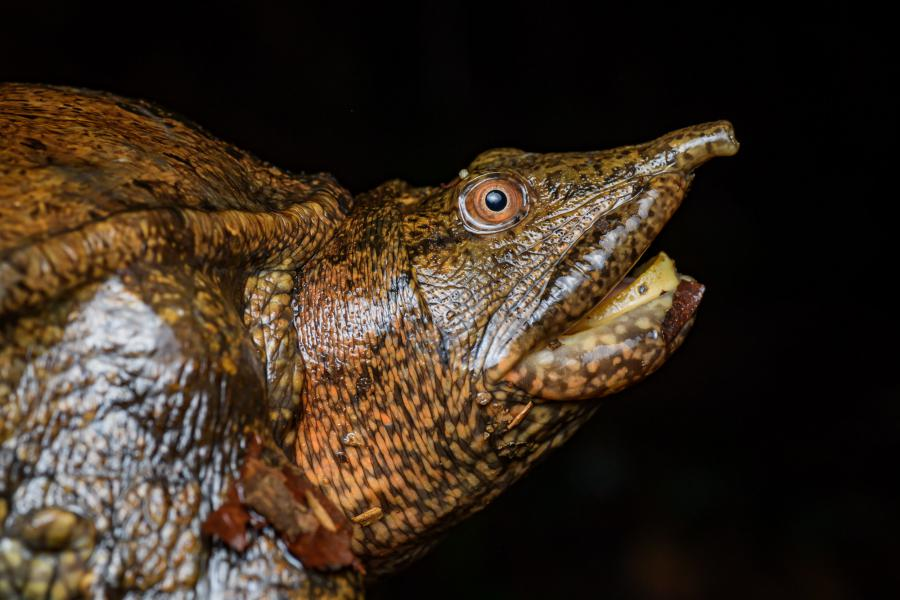
- Kaeng Krachan National Park

Conservation status
- Least Concern (IUCN 3.1)
- CITES Appendix II

Scientific classification
- Kingdom: Animalia
- Phylum: Chordata
- Class: Reptilia
- Order: Testudines
- Suborder: Cryptodira
- Family: Trionychidae
- Subfamily: Trionychinae
- Genus: Dogania; Gray, 1844
- Species: D. subplana

Binomial name
- Dogania subplana (Geoffroy Saint-Hilaire, 1809)

Synonyms
- Trionyx subplanus Geoffroy Saint-Hilaire, 1809; Gymnopus subplanus A.M.C. Duméril & Bibron, 1835; Amyda subplana Fitzinger, 1843; Dogania subplana Gray, 1844; Trionyx frenatus Gray, 1856; Dogania guentheri Gray, 1862; Trionyx guentheri Günther, 1864; Potamochelys frenatus Gray, 1864; Sarbieria frenata Gray, 1869; Trionyx dillwynii Gray, 1873; Trionyx vertebralis Strauch, 1890; Trionyx pecki Bartlett, 1895; Dogania guntheri M.A. Smith, 1931 (ex errore); Dogania subprana Nutaphand, 1979 (ex errore); Dogania subplanus Gaffney & Meylan, 1988; Trionyx subprana Nutaphand, 1990; Trionix subplanus Richard, 1999

= Malayan softshell turtle =

Species of turtle

The Malayan softshell turtle (Dogania subplana) is a species of turtle in the family Trionychidae, the softshell turtles. It is monotypic in its genus Dogania.

== Taxonomy ==
The species was first described by Étienne Geoffroy Saint-Hilaire in 1809, then under the name Trionyx subplanus. The type locality is unknown; Malaysia or Java has been discussed as alternatives, but no formal restriction has taken place. It was moved from Trionyx to Amyda in 1843 by Leopold Fitzinger, before John Edward Gray established the monotypic genus Dogania for the species in 1844.

The etymology of the generic name Dogania is unknown. The Turtle Taxonomy Working Group theorized that it might be an unknown vernacular name in an indigenous language within the species' range or an eponym honoring someone named Dogan or Dugan. The specific name subplana - originally subplanus – is derived from the Latin sub 'almost, under, below' and plana 'flat', in reference to the turtle's relatively flat carapace.

== Description and ecology ==
Malayan softshell turtles may attain a carapace length of 35 cm (14 in) as adults. The head is large and muscular. The carapace is flat, and has straight sides. Juveniles are reddish on the sides of the neck, and have a few round black spots (ocelli) on the carapace. These markings become obscure as the turtles age.

The turtle feeds on snails and other molluscs, crushing their shells with its powerful jaws.

== Distribution and habitat ==
The Malayan softshell turtle is found in Myanmar, Thailand, Malaysia (Peninsular Malaysia, Sabah, Sarawak), Singapore, Indonesia (Riau Islands, Bangka Belitung Islands), Sumatra, Java, Kalimantan) Brunei and the Philippines (Palawan, Mindanao, Mindoro, Luzon).

The species prefers to live in the clean running water which is found in rocky streams at higher elevations. It primarily inhabits forests, both primary and secondary ones, but has also been found in semi-urban areas, rice fields and abandoned mining ponds.
