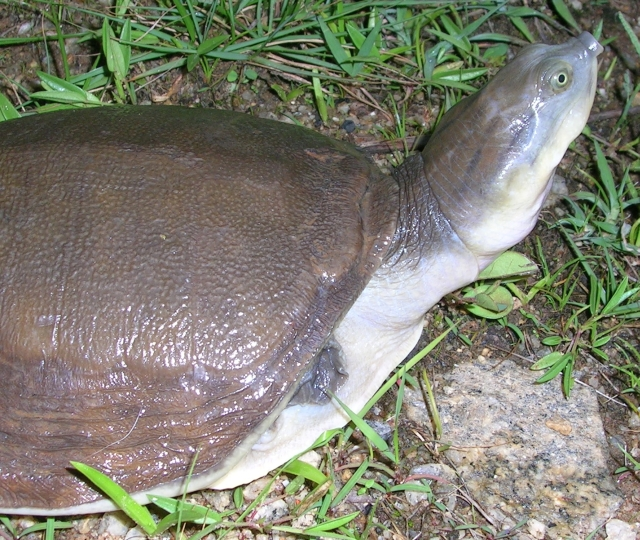
- Indian flapshell turtle Lissemys punctata

Scientific classification
- Kingdom: Animalia
- Phylum: Chordata
- Class: Reptilia
- Order: Testudines
- Suborder: Cryptodira
- Family: Trionychidae
- Subfamily: Cyclanorbinae; Lydekker, 1889

= Cyclanorbinae =

Cyclanorbinae Temporal range: Late Cretaceous to recent, 70.6–0 Ma

Subfamily of turtles

Cyclanorbinae, also known commonly as the flapshell turtles, is a subfamily of softshell turtles in the family Trionychidae. The subfamily is native to Africa and Asia.

== Taxonomy ==
Morphological evidence supports Cyclanorbinae being the sister group to the Plastomeninae, an extinct subfamily of softshell turtles that inhabited North America from the Cretaceous to the Eocene.

== Genera ==
The subfamily Cyclanorbinae contains the following three extant genera.

- Cyclanorbis Gray, 1845
- Cycloderma W. Peters, 1854
- Lissemys M.A. Smith, 1931

One extinct prehistoric genus is also known from fossil remains: Nemegtemys Danilov et al., 2014, from the Cretaceous of Mongolia.

== Geographic range ==
Species in the genera Cyclanorbis and Cycloderma are found in Africa; species in the genus Lissemys are found in Asia.
