= Softshell turtle (disambiguation) =

Softshell turtle may refer to some members of the softshell turtles (Trionychidae family):

- Asiatic softshell turtle
- Florida softshell turtle
- Smooth softshell turtle
- Spiny softshell turtle
- Asian narrow-headed softshell turtle
- Burmese narrow-headed softshell turtle
- Indian narrow-headed softshell turtle
- Malayan softshell turtle
- Black softshell turtle
- Burmese peacock softshell
- Indian softshell turtle
- Indian peacock softshell turtle
- Leith's softshell turtle
- Wattle-necked softshell turtle
- Asian giant softshell turtle
- New Guinea giant softshell turtle
- Northern New Guinea giant softshell turtle
- Chinese softshell turtle
- Hunan softshell turtle
- Lesser Chinese softshell turtle
- Northern Chinese softshell turtle
- Spotted softshell turtle
- Euphrates softshell turtle
- Yangtze giant softshell turtle
- African softshell turtle

== See also ==
- Softshell (disambiguation)
