= Pelodiscus shipian =

Scientific classification
- Kingdom: Animalia
- Phylum: Chordata
- Class: Reptilia
- Order: Testudines
- Suborder: Cryptodira
- Family: Trionychidae
- Genus: Pelodiscus
- Species: P. shipian

Binomial name
- Pelodiscus shipian Gong et al., 2022
- Map showing genetically verified records.

Synonyms
- Pelodiscus jiangxiensis Hou et al, 2022

Species of turtle endemic to China

Pelodiscus shipian is a species of turtle in the family Trionychidae. Like its closest relatives, Pelodiscus huangshanensis and Pelodiscus axenaria, the species is endemic to China. Especially Pelodiscus axenaria is morphologically similar to Pelodiscus shipian, and these species may have been confused with each other in the past; Pelodiscus shipian was described only in 2022.

== Etymology ==
In Fengxin County, the local name for Pelodiscus shipian is shi pian bie (石片鱉), meaning "stone slab soft-shelled turtle". The name refers to the turtle looking like a flat stone. The species epithet shipian is derived from the first part of the local Chinese name, shi pian (石片), meaning "slab". The describers of Pelodiscus shipian suggested an English name for the turtle, Chinese stone slab soft-shelled turtle.

== Taxonomy ==
Pelodiscus shipian belongs to the genus Pelodiscus, which was previously lumped together as a single species, Pelodiscus sinensis. In 1991, a new species of the genus was described as Pelodiscus axenaria, but its distinctiveness was often questioned until it was confirmed by molecular genetic studies in 2010. In 2018, Shiping Gong and colleagues discovered a genetically distinct lineage of the Pelodiscus axenaria complex. They initially called it "lineage I", until they described it as a new species, Pelodiscus shipian, in 2022. Some older records of Pelodiscus axenaria may actually represent Pelodiscus shipian. The Pelodiscus axenaria complex also includes Pelodiscus huangshanensis, which was described in 2021.

After Gong and colleagues discovered the cryptic "lineage I", another group of researchers also began collecting and studying specimens of the new lineage. They wrote a species description, where they gave "lineage I" the name Pelodiscus jiangxiensis. As of October 2022, the paper is only accessible as a preprint and thus doesn't have any nomenclatural value according to the ICZN rules. The description of Pelodiscus shipian, on the other hand, was published already in April 2022.

=== Phylogeny ===
Based on phylogenetic analyses, Pelodiscus shipian is the sister species of Pelodiscus huangshanensis, with the second closest relative being Pelodiscus axenaria. These three species constitute the Pelodiscus axenaria complex, which forms a clade sister to all other Pelodiscus species.

== Description ==
Pelodiscus shipian is the second smallest extant turtle species (second only to Kinosternon vogti), with an adult carapace length of 8–10 centimetres (3.1–3.9 in). Pelodiscus shipian can be confused with the other species of the Pelodiscus axenaria complex, especially with Pelodiscus axenaria. The carapace color of Pelodiscus shipian is typically olive clay with greenish-black marbling. The carapace is distinctly keeled, and the entoplastron is boomerang-shaped. The plastron is yellowish-white and has no markings except for the dark patches near the armpits.

== Distribution and habitat ==
Like all species of the Pelodiscus axenaria complex, Pelodiscus shipian is endemic to China. The type locality is in Fengxin County, Jiangxi Province. Other genetically verified records exist from the neighboring Hunan Province. However, the exact distribution range of the species is still unknown. Both Pelodiscus shipian and Pelodiscus axenaria are confirmed to be present in Hunan, and they may be sympatric.

Pelodiscus shipian has a strict habitat preference. It only lives in parts of rivers that have sandy bottoms and clear water that is rich in oxygen. It's also highly sensitive to anthropogenic disturbance.

== Threats ==
Within its native range, Pelodiscus shipian is highly valued as human food. Hunting is not restricted or regulated, and the species is widely hunted by local villagers. The species is more restricted in its habitat preference than the much more common Pelodiscus sinensis, making Pelodiscus shipian vulnerable to overhunting.
