= Giant softshell turtle =

Giant softshell turtle may refer to the following:

- Asian giant softshell turtle (Pelochelys cantorii), or Cantor's giant softshell turtle
- New Guinea giant softshell turtle (Pelochelys bibroni)
- Northern New Guinea giant softshell turtle (Pelochelys signifera)
- Yangtze giant softshell turtle (Rafetus swinhoei)
- Pelochelys, the genus of giant softshell turtles
- Axestemys, an extinct genus of softshell turtle

== See also ==
- Softshell turtle
