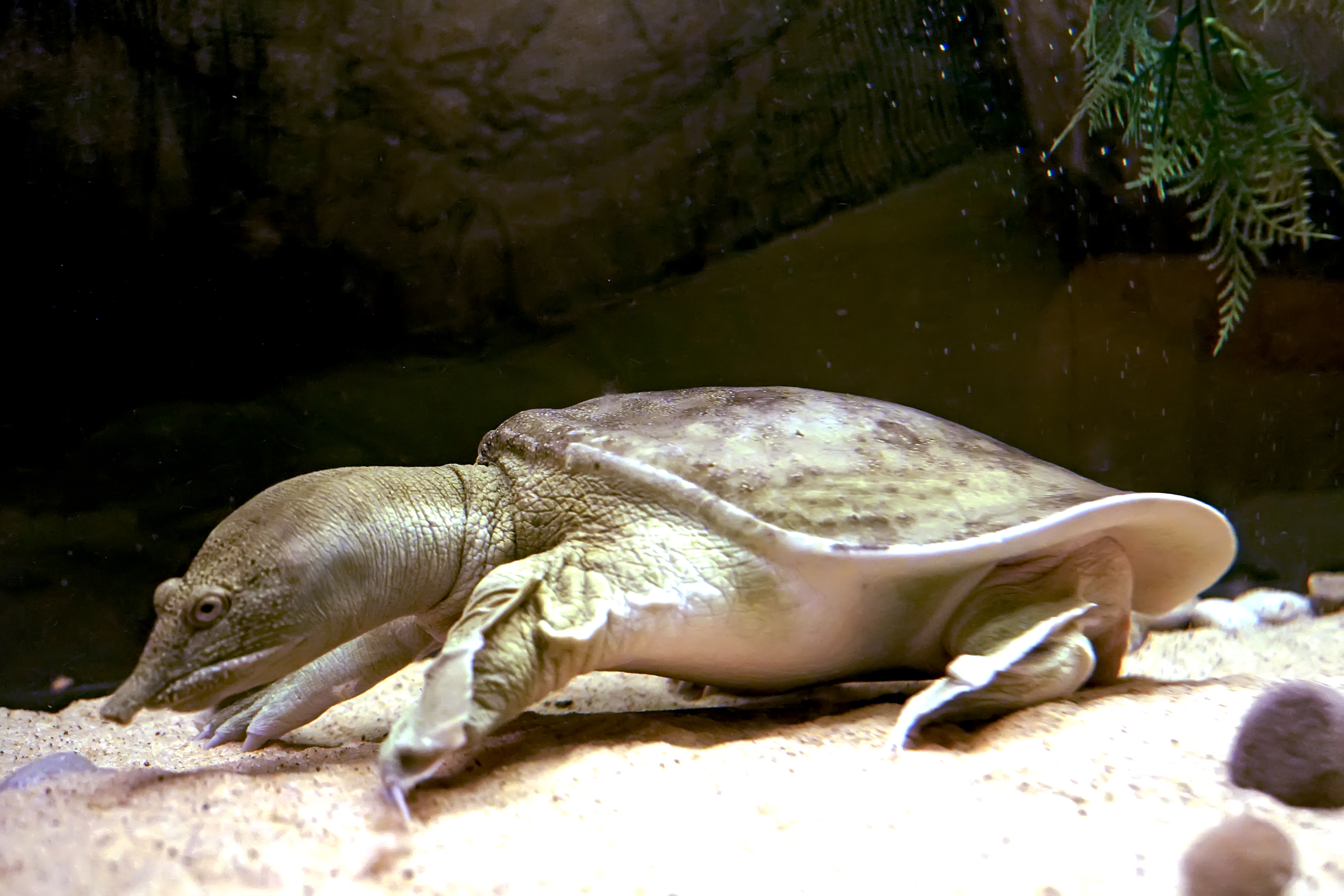

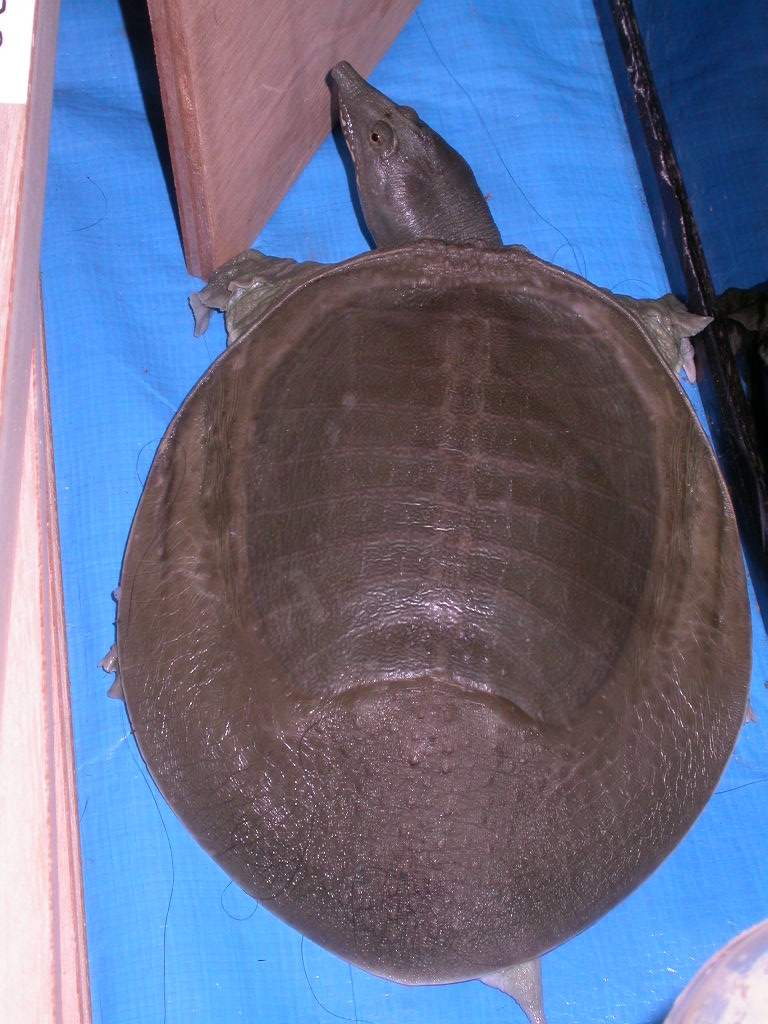

Conservation status
- Vulnerable (IUCN 3.1)
- CITES Appendix II

Scientific classification
- Kingdom: Animalia
- Phylum: Chordata
- Class: Reptilia
- Order: Testudines
- Suborder: Cryptodira
- Family: Trionychidae
- Genus: Pelodiscus
- Species: P. sinensis

Binomial name
- Pelodiscus sinensis (Wiegmann, 1835)

Synonyms
- See text

= Chinese softshell turtle =

Species of turtle

The Chinese softshell turtle (Pelodiscus sinensis) is a species of softshell turtle that is native to mainland China (Inner Mongolia to Guangxi, including Hong Kong) and Taiwan, with records of escapees—some of which have established introduced populations—in a wide range of other Asian countries, as well as Spain, Brazil and Hawaii.

Populations native to Northeast China, Russia, Korea and Japan were formerly included in this species, but are now regarded as separate as the northern Chinese softshell turtle (P. maackii). Furthermore, localized populations in Guangxi and Hunan (where the Chinese softshell turtle also is present), as well as Vietnam, are recognized as the lesser Chinese softshell turtle (P. parviformis) and Hunan softshell turtle (P. axenaria).

The Chinese softshell turtle is a vulnerable species, threatened by disease, habitat loss, and collection for food such as turtle soup. Additionally, millions are now farmed, especially in China, to support the food industry, and it is the world's most economically important turtle.

== Description ==
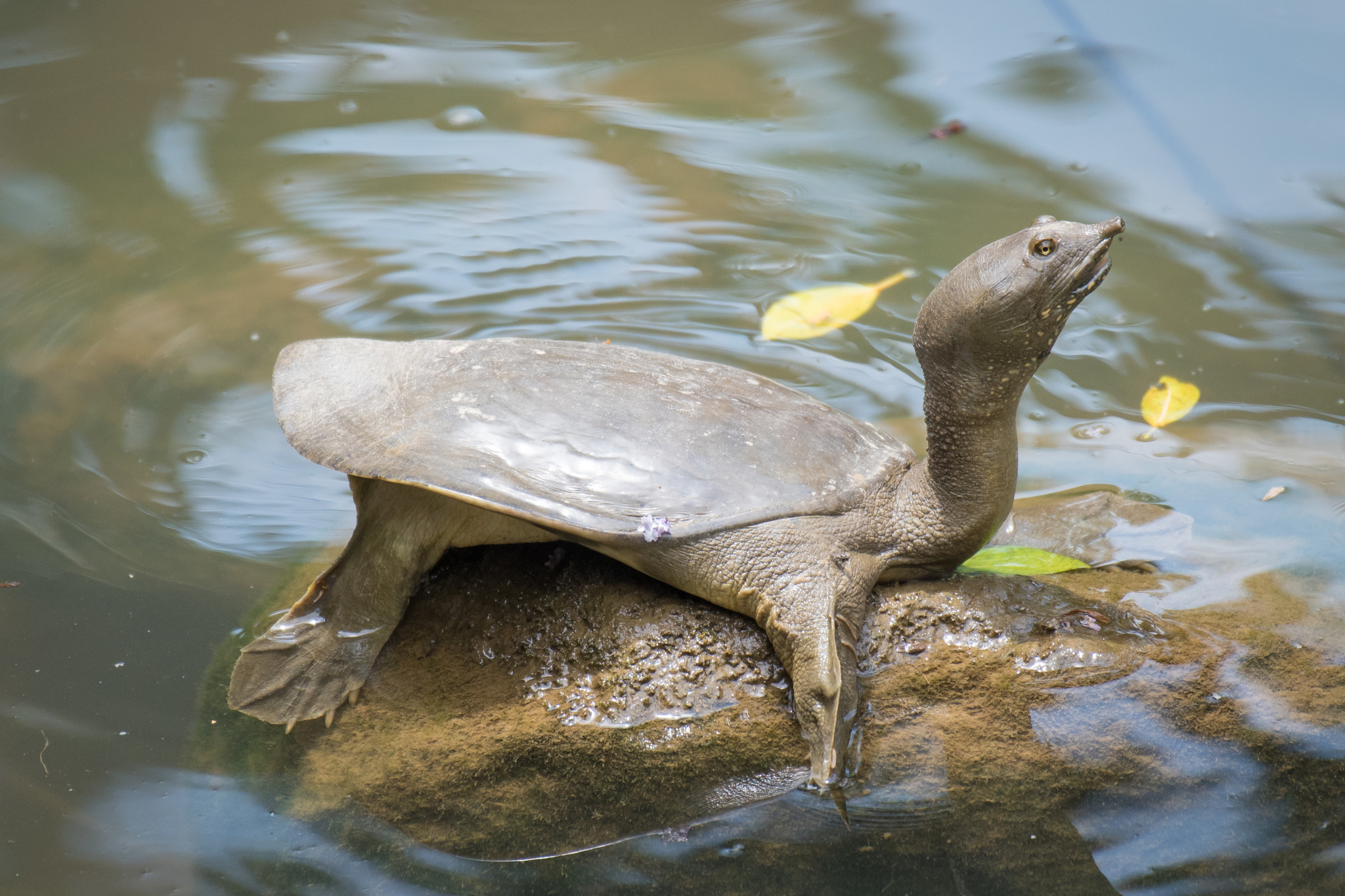
Basking, in Taiwan

Females of the Chinese softshell turtle can reach a straight-line carapace length of up to 33 cm (13 in) while the smaller males reach 27 cm (11 in), with longer tails than the females. Sexual maturity is reached at a carapace length of 18–19 cm (7.1–7.5 in).

It has webbed feet for swimming. It is called "softshell" because its carapace lacks horny scutes (scales). The carapace is leathery and pliable, particularly at the sides. The central part of the carapace has a layer of solid bone beneath it, as in other turtles, but this is absent at the outer edges. The light and flexible shell of this turtle allows it to move more easily in open water, or in muddy lake bottoms.

The carapace of P. sinensis is olive in color and may have dark blotches. The plastron is orange-red, and may also have large dark blotches. The limbs and head are olive dorsally with the forelimbs lighter and the hind-limbs orange-red ventrally. There are dark flecks on the head and dark lines that radiate from the eyes. The throat is mottled and there may be small, dark bars on the lips. A pair of dark blotches is found in front of the tail as well as a black band on the posterior side of each thigh.

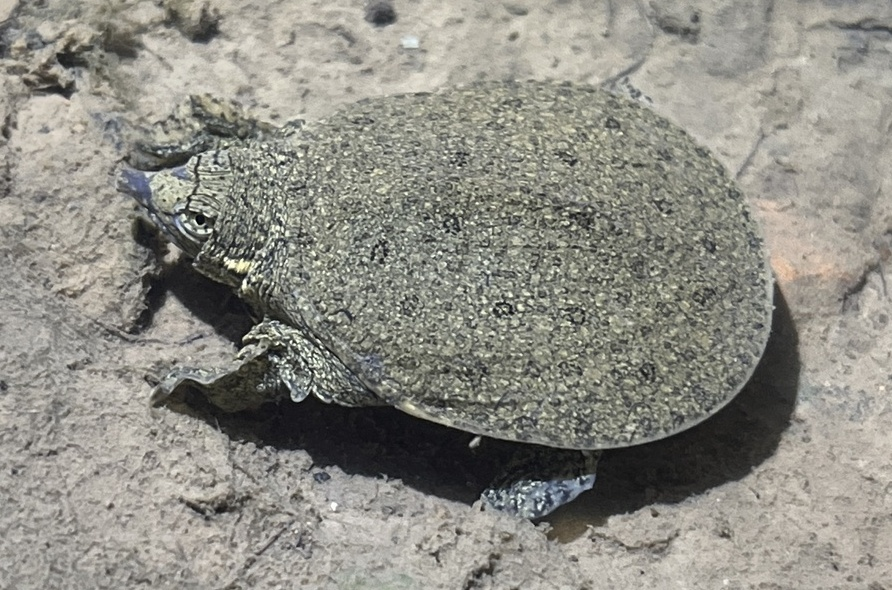
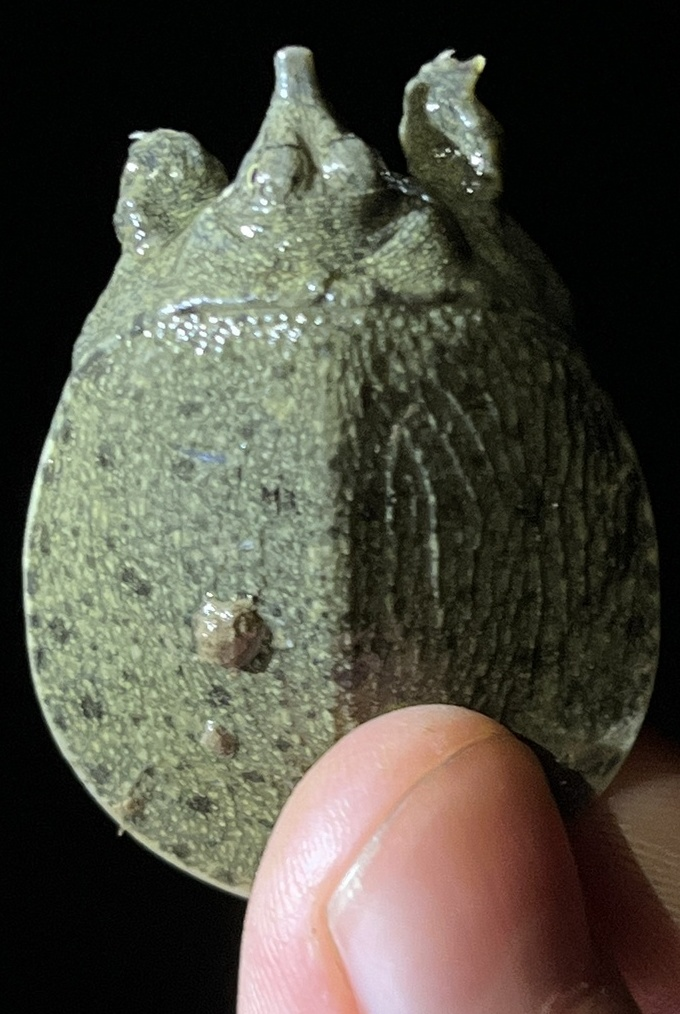
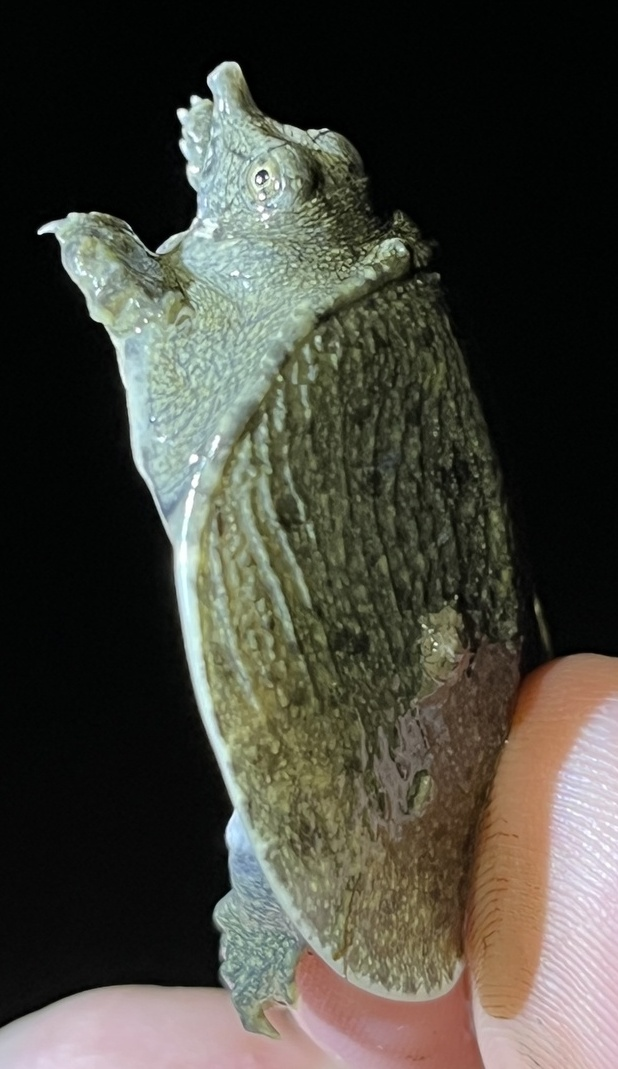
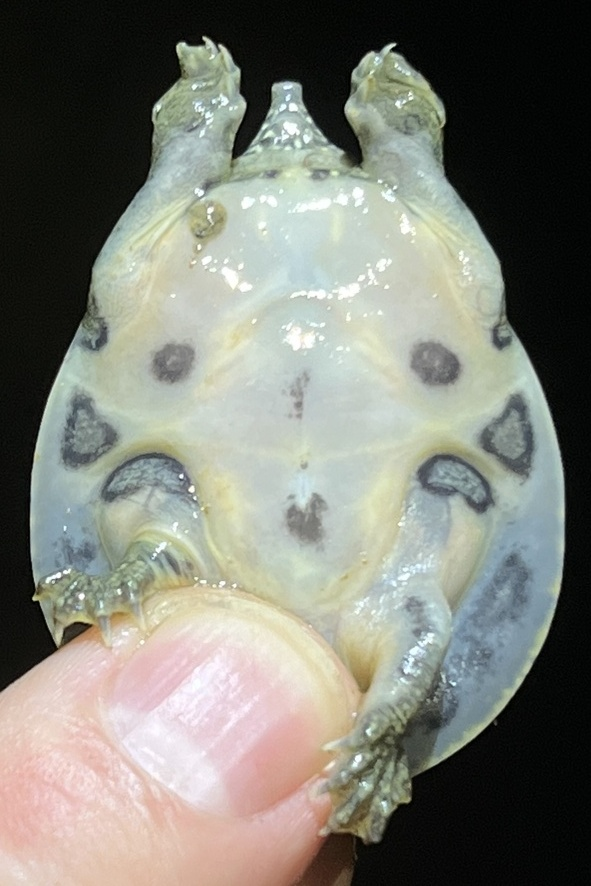
Juvenile

== Distribution and habitat ==
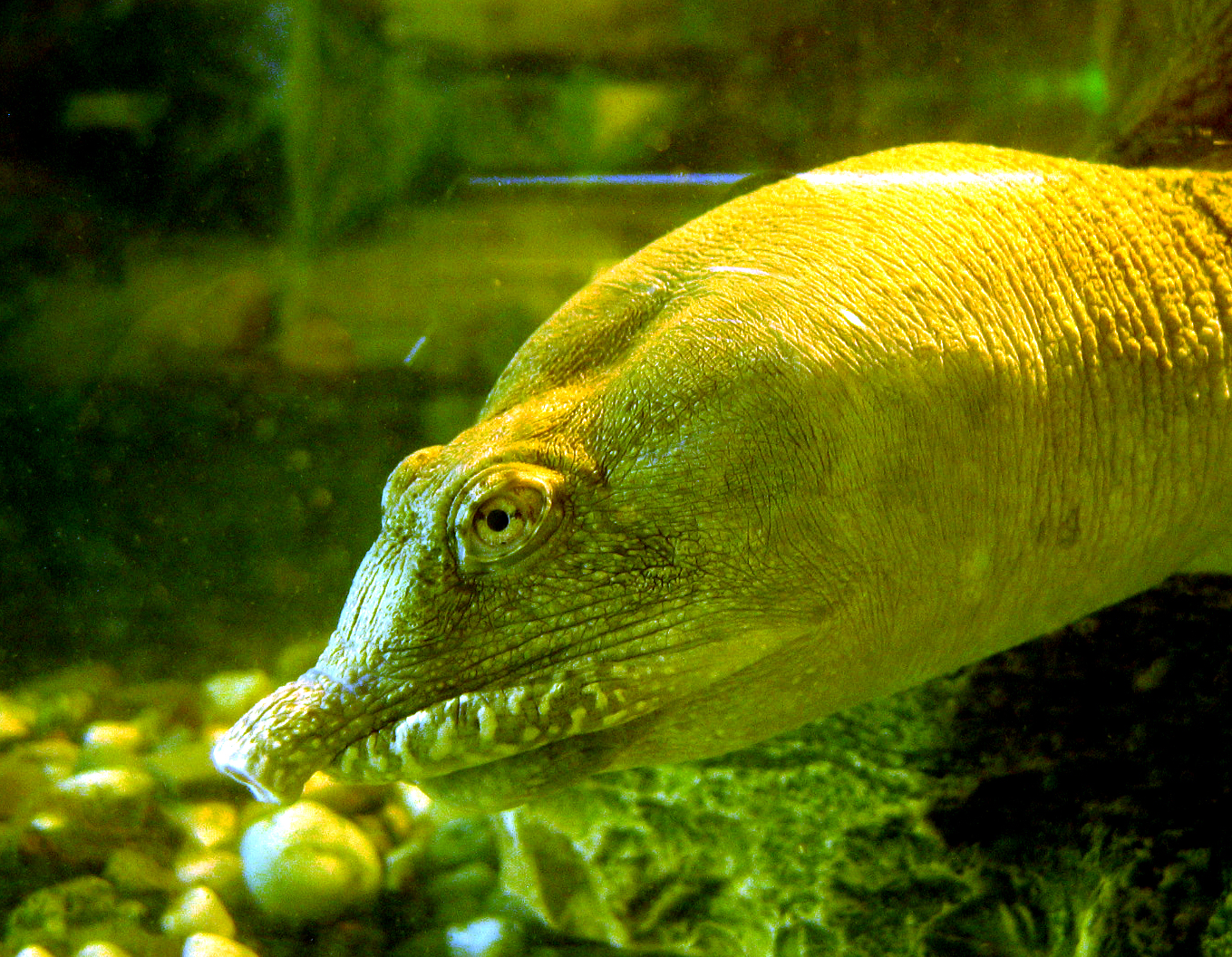
Pelodiscus sinensis

=== Distribution ===
The Chinese softshell turtle is native to Taiwan and China, where it is found in Anhui, Fujian, Gansu, Guangdong, Guangxi, Guizhou, Hebei, Henan, Hong Kong, Hubei, Hunan, Inner Mongolia (Nei Mongol), Jiangsu, Jiangxi, Shaanxi, Shandong, Shanxi, Sichuan, Yunnan and Zhejiang Provinces.

Populations native to Northeast China, Russia, Korea and Japan were formerly included in this species, but are now regarded as separate as the Amur softshell turtle (P. maackii). Populations in Vietnam and Hainan Island are now recognized as the spotted softshell turtle (P. variegatus). Furthermore, localized populations in Guangxi, Hunan, and Anhui (where the Chinese softshell turtle also is present) are recognized as the lesser Chinese softshell turtle (P. parviformis), Hunan softshell turtle (P. axenaria), and Huangshan softshell turtle (P. huangshanensis).

It is difficult to determine the exact native range of the Chinese softshell turtle due to the long tradition of its use as a food and herbal medicinal, and subsequent spread by migrating people. Outside its native China, escapees have been recorded in a wide range of countries and some of these have becomes established as introduced populations. Among the non-native locations in Asia are the Bonin Islands, Honshu, Kyushu, Ryukyu Archipelago and Shikoku in Japan; South Korea; Laos; Vietnam; Thailand; Singapore; Bohol, Cebu, Leyte, Luzon, Mindanao, Mindoro and Panay in the Philippines; East and Peninsular Malaysia; Kalimantan, Sumatra and West Timor in Indonesia; East Timor; and Iran. Outside Asia, locations include Pará in Brazil; Spain; and Guam, Northern Mariana Islands and Oahu (Hawaii) in the United States. In the places where the Chinese softshell turtle is not native, the species has become a pest and invasive species, endangering various indigenous species in areas where it has been introduced and destabilizing numerous ecosystems. In 2024, the species was found in the Merrimack River in Massachusetts.

=== Habitat ===
The Chinese softshell turtle lives in fresh and brackish water. In China it is found in rivers, lakes, ponds, canals and creeks with slow currents, and in Hawaii they can be found in marshes and drainage ditches.

== Ecology and behavior ==
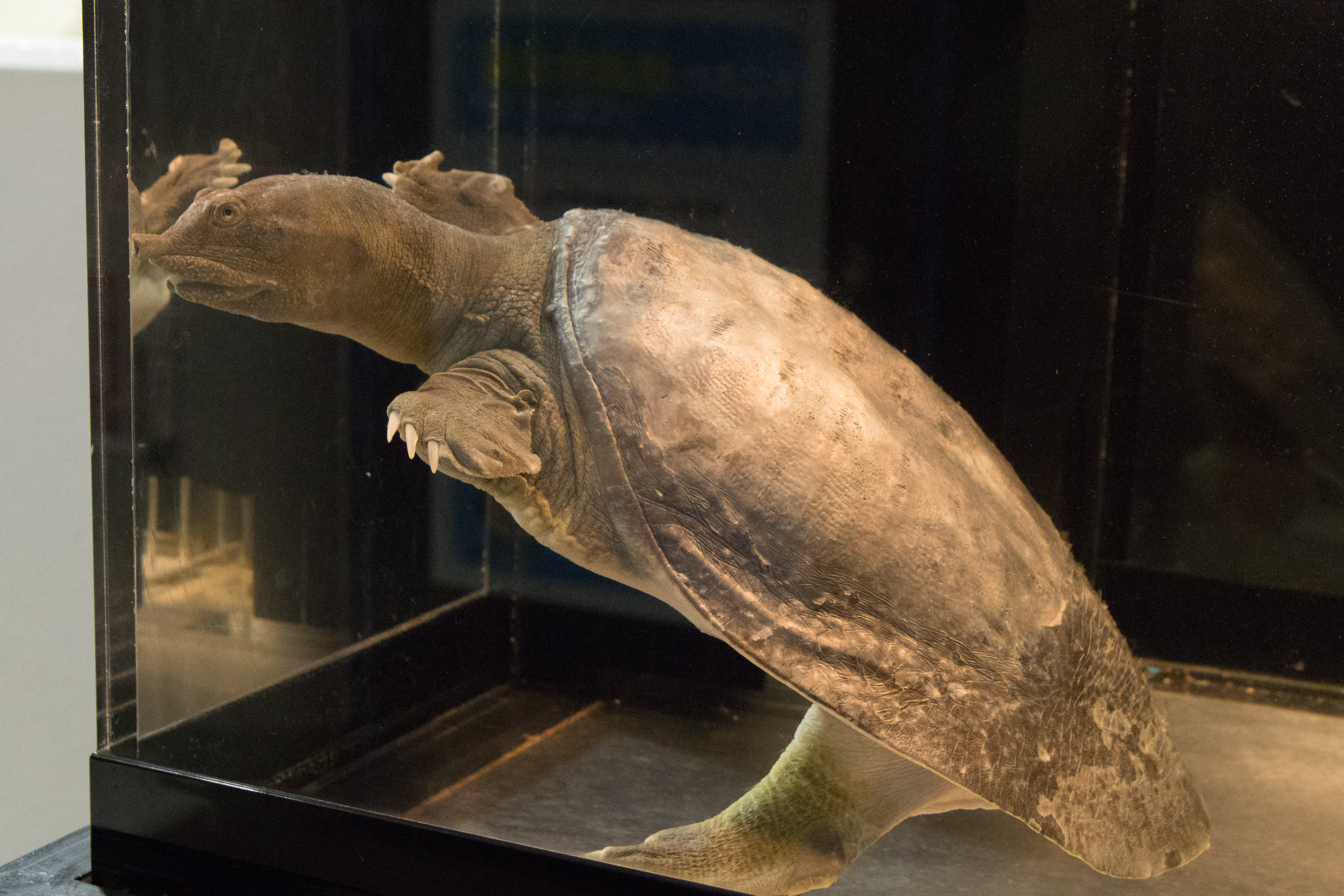

=== Diet ===
P. sinensis is predominantly carnivorous and the remains of fish, crustaceans, mollusks, insects, and seeds of marsh plants have been found in its stomach.

=== Movement ===
With its long snout and tubelike nostrils, the Chinese softshell turtle can "snorkel" in shallow water. When resting, it lies at the bottom, buried in sand or mud, lifting its head to breathe or snatch at prey. Its basking habit is not well developed.

The Chinese softshell turtle often submerges its head in water. This is because the species carries a gene which produces a protein that allows it to secrete urea from their mouths. This adaptation helps it to survive in brackish water by making it possible for it to excrete urea without drinking too much salty water. Rather than eliminating urea by urinating through its cloaca as most turtles do, which involves significant water loss, it simply rinses its mouth in the water.

When provoked, certain populations of P. sinensis are capable of excreting a foul smelling fluid from pores on the anterior edge of their shells.

=== Life cycle ===
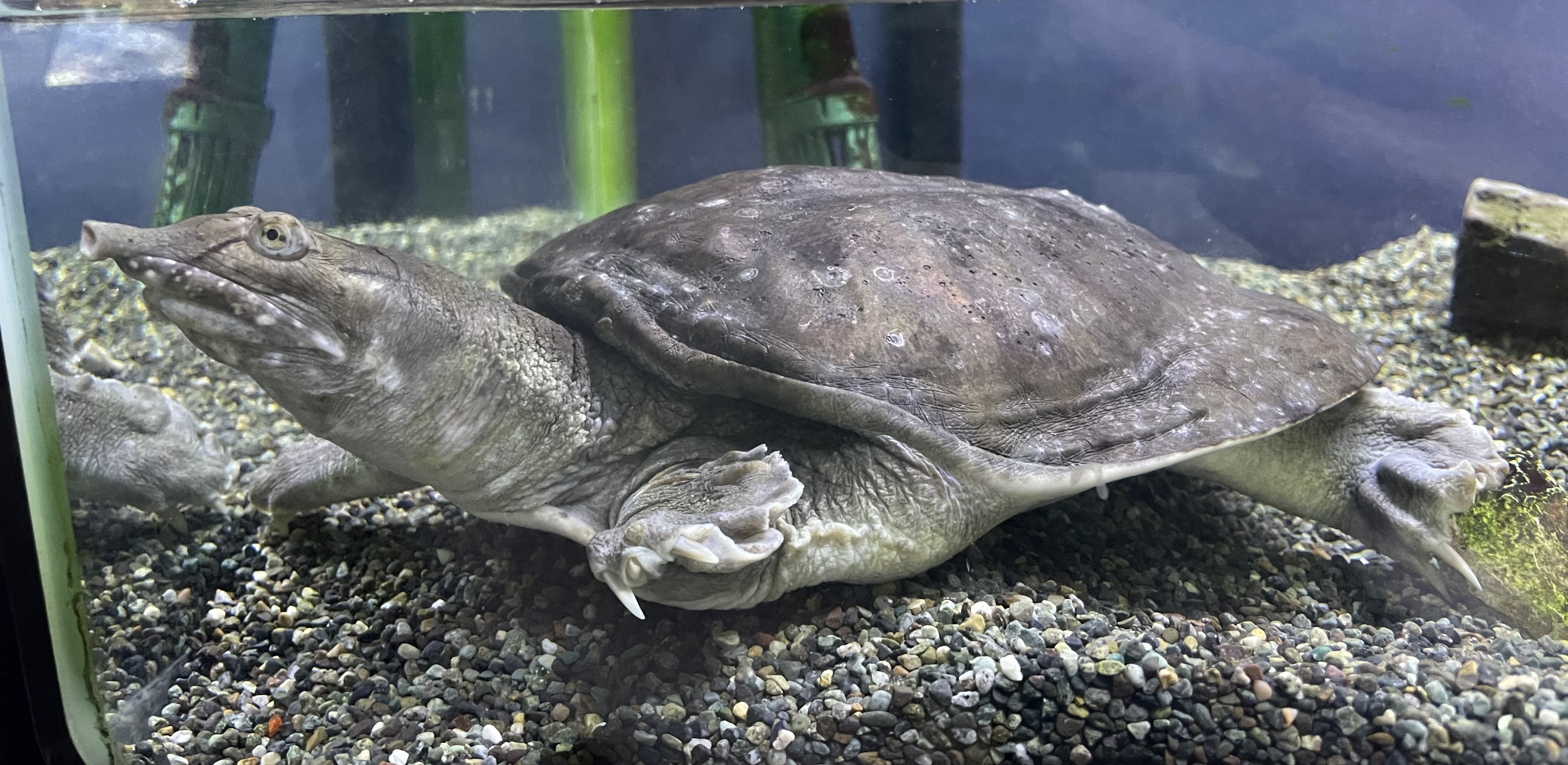
At Chitose Aquarium in Hokkaido, Japan

The Chinese softshell turtle reaches sexual maturity sometime between 4 and 6 years of age. It mates at the surface or under water. A male will hold the female's carapace with its forelimbs and may bite at her head, neck, and limbs. Females may retain sperm for almost a year after copulation.

The females lay 8–30 eggs in a clutch and may lay from 2 to 5 clutches each year. The eggs are laid in a nest that is about 76–102 mm (3–4 in) across at the entrance. Eggs are spherical and average about 20 mm (0.79 in) in diameter. After an incubation period of about 60 days, which may be longer or shorter depending upon temperature, the eggs hatch. Average hatchling carapace length is about 25 mm (1 in) and width is also about 25 mm (1 in). Sex of the hatchlings is not determined by incubation temperature.

=== Diseases ===
In the intensive aquacultural industry the Chinese softshell turtle is increasingly vulnerable to multiple bacterial diseases. In 2012 the Chinese soft-shell turtle was the first turtle species to undergo a large-scale outbreak of bacterial softshell disease, resulting in slower growth and increased fatality. This lead not only to a decline in P. sinensis, but caused severe economic losses to the turtle culture industry. Aeromonas spp., Citrobacter freundii, and Edwardsiella tarda have all been identified as the most significant causative bacterial organisms. Other bacterial pathogens identified have been Chryseobacterium spp., Morganella morganii and Bacillus cereus spp..

== Conservation ==
Wild populations are listed as vulnerable on the IUCN Red List. In contrast, the mass farming and release of P. sinensis has been known to lead to hybridization producing several other unique Pelodiscus lineages, some of which may be distinct species, which in turn threaten the gene pool.

== Relations with humans ==
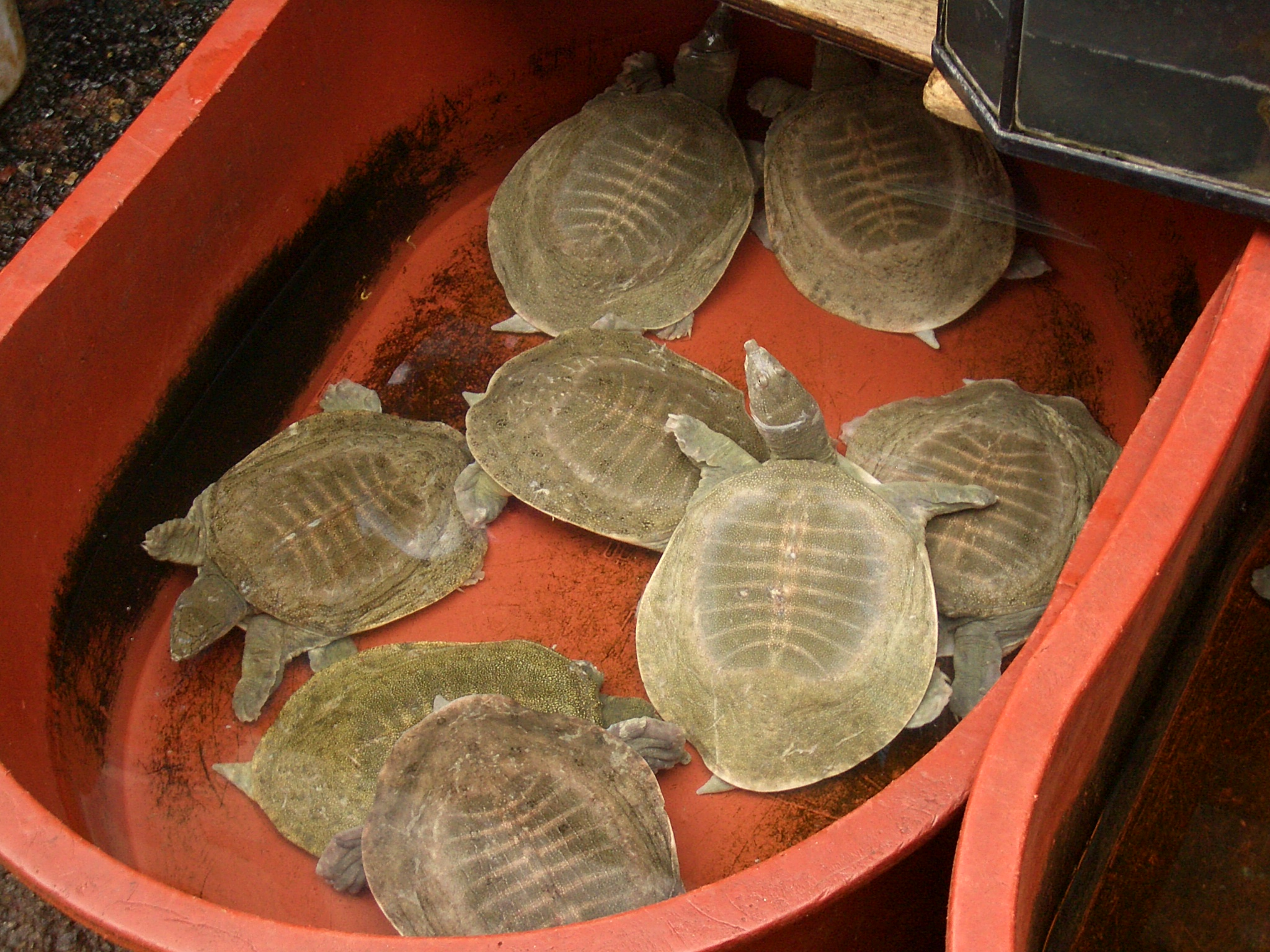
Being sold in Seoul, South Korea

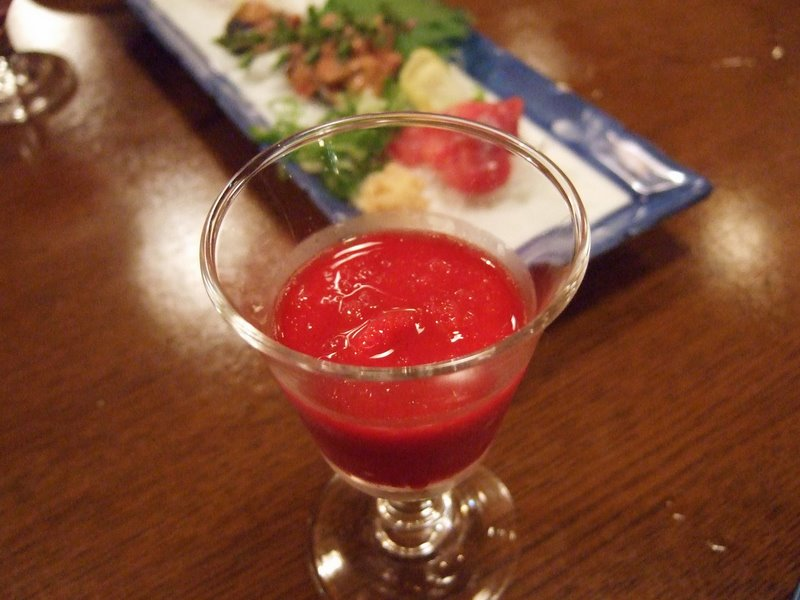
Turtle blood mixed with sake in Japan

Global aquaculture production of Chinese softshell turtle (Trionyx sinensis) in thousand tonnes from 1990 to 2022, as reported by the FAO

The Chinese softshell turtle is the most commonly raised species in China's turtle farms. According to the data obtained from 684 Chinese turtle farms, they sold over 91 million turtles of this species every year; considering that these farms represented less than half of the 1,499 registered turtle farms in China, the nationwide total could be over twice as high. The Chinese softshell turtle is considered a delicacy in many parts of Asia. Turtle soup is made from this species. In Japan, it may be stewed with hōtō noodles and served as a winter delicacy. Many Koreans, even today, generally have a taboo against eating turtles which has origins in native Korean shamanism. Similar shamanism can be seen in its historical use in plastromancy for oracle bone divination in Shang dynasty China, circa 1600 to 1046 B.C.

P. sinensis can be injured if it is dropped or hit, and is susceptible to shell fungus. Captives of this species will eat canned and fresh fish, canned dog food, raw beef, mice, frogs, and chicken. However, in captivity it does not usually eat turtle feed. It can deliver a painful bite if provoked, but will usually let go after a while.

=== Cultural depictions ===
In a 2018 interview with Le Monde, Nintendo character designer Yōichi Kotabe stated that the Chinese softshell turtle inspired the design for Bowser, the main antagonist of the Mario franchise. Kotabe chose the species because of its aggressive nature.

== Synonyms ==
Numerous synonyms have been used for this species:

- Testudo rostrata Thunberg, 1787 (nomen suppressum)
- Testudo striata Suckow, 1798
- Testudo semimembranacea Hermann, 1804 (nomen suppressum et rejectum)
- Emydes rostrata – Brongniart, 1805
- Trionyx (Aspidonectes) sinensis Wiegmann, 1834 (nomen conservandum)
- Trionyx japonicus – Temminck & Schlegel, 1835
- Trionyx tuberculatus Cantor, 1842
- Pelodiscus sinensis – Fitzinger, 1843
- Tyrse perocellata Gray, 1844
- Trionyx perocellatus – Gray, 1856
- Trionyx schlegelii Brandt, 1857
- Potamochelys perocellatus – Gray, 1864
- Potamochelys tuberculatus – Gray, 1864
- Landemania irrorata Gray, 1869
- Landemania perocellata – Gray, 1869
- Trionyx peroculatus Günther, 1869 (ex errore)
- Gymnopus perocellatus – David, 1872
- Gymnopus simonii David, 1875 (nomen nudum)
- Ceramopelta latirostris Heude, 1880
- Cinctisternum bicinctum Heude, 1880
- Coelognathus novemcostatus Heude, 1880
- Coptopelta septemcostata Heude, 1880
- Gomphopelta officinae Heude, 1880
- Psilognathus laevis Heude, 1880
- Temnognathus mordax Heude, 1880
- Trionyx sinensis newtoni Bethencourt-Ferreira, 1897
- Tortisternum novemcostatum Heude, 1880
- Temnognanthus mordax – Boulenger, 1889
- Tyrse sinensis – Hay, 1904
- Amyda japonica – Stejneger, 1907
- Amyda schlegelii – Stejneger, 1907
- Amyda sinensis – Stejneger, 1907
- Amyda tuberculata – Schmidt, 1927
- Trionyx sinensis sinensis – Smith, 1931
- Trionyx sinensis tuberculatus – Smith, 1931
- Amyda schlegelii haseri Pavlov, 1932
- Amyda schlegelii licenti Pavlov, 1932
- Amyda sinensis sinensis – Mertens, Müller & Rust, 1934
- Amyda sinensis tuberculata – Mertens, Müller & Rust, 1934
- Trionyx schlegeli Chkhikvadze, 1987 (ex errore)
- Trionix sinensis – Richard, 1999
- Pelodiscus sinensis sinensis – Ferri, 2002
- Pelodiscus sinensis tuberculatus – Ferri, 2002
- Pelodiscus sinensis japonicus – Joseph-Ouni, 2004

== Genetics ==
The genome of Pelodiscus sinensis was sequenced in 2013 to examine the development and evolution of the softshell turtle body plan.

== Bibliography ==
- Wiegmann, A. F. A. 1835. Beiträge zur Zoologie, gesammelt auf einer Reise um die Erde, von Dr. F. J. F. Meyen. Amphibien ". Nova Acta Acad. Leopold.-Carol. 17: 185-268. ("Trionyx (Aspidonectes ) sinensis ", new species, pp. 189–195). (in German).
