= Softshell =

Softshell, soft-shell, Soft Shell or variants may refer to:

- Trionychidae or soft-shell turtle
- Soft-shell crab
- Soft shell, a weather-resistant outer clothing layer
- Soft Shell, Kentucky

== See also ==
- Softshell turtle (disambiguation)
