= Huangshan softshell turtle =

Conservation status
- CITES Appendix II

Scientific classification
- Kingdom: Animalia
- Phylum: Chordata
- Class: Reptilia
- Order: Testudines
- Suborder: Cryptodira
- Family: Trionychidae
- Genus: Pelodiscus
- Species: P. huangshanensis

Binomial name
- Pelodiscus huangshanensis Gong et al., 2021

Species of turtle endemic to China

The Huangshan softshell turtle or horse-hoof softshell turtle (Pelodiscus huangshanensis) is a species of turtle in the family Trionychidae. It is endemic to China, where it is found only in southern Anhui Province, in the Huangshan range.

== Taxonomy ==
Prior to 2021, populations of this species were considered conspecific with the more widespread Chinese softshell turtle (P. sinensis), which was thought to be the only native softshell turtle in the province. However, local people knew about the existence of this species over a millennium prior. Folk songs and poems noted a second form of softshell turtle in the Huangshan range, referred to as the "horse-hoof softshell turtle" or mǎ tí biē (马蹄鳖). Phylogenetic evidence of these populations found them to be a distinct species most closely related to the Hunan softshell turtle (P. axenaria) as well as an undescribed Pelodiscus from Jiangxi. It was accepted as a distinct species by the Turtle Taxonomy Working Group later that year.

== Habitat and ecology ==
P. huangshanensis can also be distinguished be distinguished from P. sinensis by their ecological niches: P. sinensis is adapted to various aquatic habitats, while P. huangshanensis is restricted to clear rivers with fine sand, primarily located near the source of the Qiantang River.

== Description ==
This species is referred to as the "horse-hoof softshell turtle" due to it being significantly smaller than P. sinensis, being only as large as a horse's hoof.

== Status ==
A more restricted habitat has made P. huangshanensis vulnerable to habitat destruction and overhunting, which has greatly reduced its population. Captive breeding of this species has been successful.
