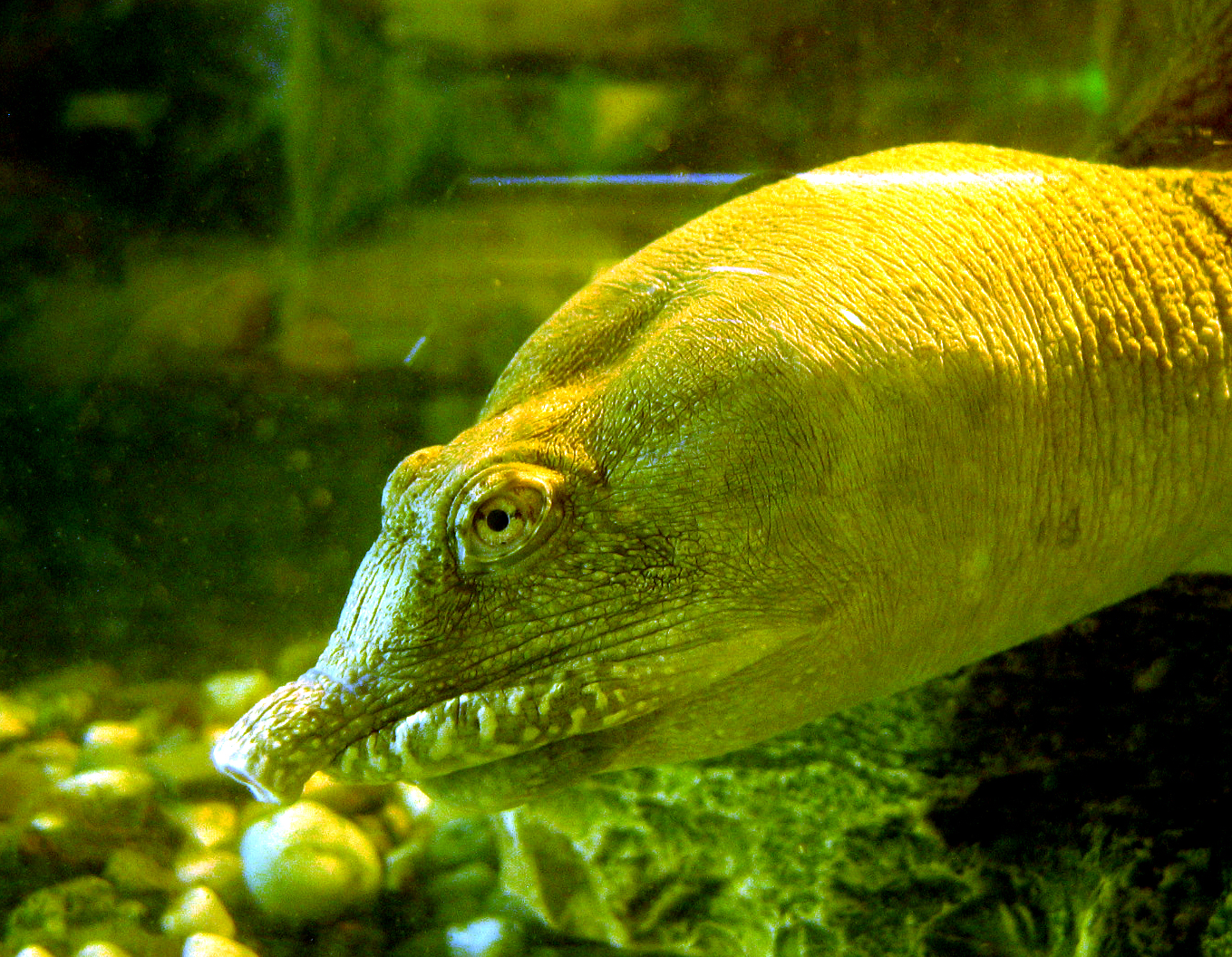
- Pelodiscus sinensis, Chinese softshell turtle

Conservation status
- CITES Appendix II

Scientific classification
- Kingdom: Animalia
- Phylum: Chordata
- Class: Reptilia
- Order: Testudines
- Suborder: Cryptodira
- Family: Trionychidae
- Subfamily: Trionychinae
- Genus: Pelodiscus; Fitzinger, 1835

Species
- See text

= Pelodiscus =

Genus of turtles

Pelodiscus is a genus of turtles in the family Trionychidae, the softshells. Based on genetic and morphological analysis there are seven valid species. They are native to Eastern Asia, ranging from the Amur region, south through China and Korea, as far south as Vietnam. Populations in Japan are thought to likely originate from historic human introductions.

Phylogenetic studies have recovered a high diversity of Pelodiscus genotypes in China, some of which may correspond to distinct species. However, the millennia-old practice of farming Pelodiscus for consumption, especially in large-scale turtle farms since the late 20th century, is thought to threaten these lineages due to hybridization with farmed individuals.

== Species ==
The following species are recognized by the Turtle Taxonomy Working Group:

- Pelodiscus axenaria (Zhou, Zhang & Fang, 1991) — Hunan softshell turtle
- Pelodiscus huangshanensis Y. Gong, Peng, S. Huang, Lin, R. Huang, Xu, Yang & Nie, 2021 — Huangshan softshell turtle, horse-hoof softshell turtle (potentially synonymous with P. axenaria)
- Pelodiscus maackii (Brandt, 1857) — Amur softshell turtle, northern Chinese softshell turtle
- Pelodiscus parviformis Tang, 1997 — lesser Chinese softshell turtle
- Pelodiscus shipian S. Gong, Fritz, Vamberger, Gao & Farkas, 2022 — Chinese stone slab softshell turtle (potentially synonymous with P. axenaria)
- Pelodiscus sinensis (Wiegmann, 1835) — Chinese softshell turtle
- Pelodiscus variegatus Farkas, Ziegler, Pham, Ong & Fritz, 2019 — spotted softshell turtle
- †Pelodiscus gracilia

Nota bene: In the above list, a binomial authority in parentheses indicates that the species was originally described in a genus other than Pelodiscus.
