= Lesser Chinese softshell turtle =

Conservation status
- CITES Appendix II

Scientific classification
- Kingdom: Animalia
- Phylum: Chordata
- Class: Reptilia
- Order: Testudines
- Suborder: Cryptodira
- Family: Trionychidae
- Genus: Pelodiscus
- Species: P. parviformis

Binomial name
- Pelodiscus parviformis Tang, 1997

Species of turtle

The lesser Chinese softshell turtle (Pelodiscus parviformis) is a species of turtle in the family Trionychidae. It is endemic to Guangxi and Hunan, China. It is a small turtle, with a maximum carapace length of 16 cm (6.3 in). Due to the species' restricted distribution and heavy human exploitation it has been proposed that it be classified as a critically endangered species once a IUCN Red List assessment is made.

== Taxonomy ==
The species was first described in 1997 by Yezhong Tang. A range of "Quanzhou, Xingan, Guanyang, Ziyuan, Lingchuan counties in Guangxi; Dongan, Qiyang, Daoxian in Hunan" was given rather than a single type locality. The specific name parviformis is derived from the Latin parva 'small, insignificant' and formis 'shape, form, appearance', in reference to the species' small size.

There is some disagreement among researchers over whether P parviformis is a valid species or a synonym of P. sinensis, and the lack of a revised diagnosis leaves the species with a somewhat unclear status. As of 2025, they were recognized by the Turtle Taxonomy Working Group as valid species.

Some turtle populations in Vietnam and Hainan were previously considered to belong to P. parviformis, but have now been described as their own species, P. variegatus, and were as of 2025 were recognized as such by the Turtle Taxonomy Working Group.

== Description ==
The lesser Chinese softshell turtle is a small species, having a maximum carapace length of 16 cm (6.3 in). The carapace has discrete dorsal tubercles and a small central tubercle, located in front of the marginal ridge.

The carapace is primarily yellowish-brown and has a pattern of "dark marbling" with indistinct star-shaped spots. The plastron is yellowish-white. The shell has a leathery margin; on the top of the carapace the perimeter of this margin has "ill-defined half oval blotches" around it, and on the underside of the carapace the margin is unmarked.

The head has many dark brown to black markings, and thin and discontinous pre- and postocular stripes. The throat also has black markings, but they are tiny and barely discernable.

== Distribution and conservation ==
The species is endemic to the Chinese provinces of Guangxi and Hunan. It has an estimated indigenous area of occupancy of 22,224 km^{2} (8,581 sq mi) and an estimated indigenous area of extent of 34,760 km^{2} (13,420 sq mi).

The species is covered by CITES Appendix II. It had not yet been assessed for the IUCN Red List as of 2025, but due to its restricted distribution and the heavy level of human exploitation it is subject to it is proposed that it be considered a critically endangered species.
