= Chelonitoxism =

Rare food poisoning from eating turtles

Chelonitoxism or chelonitoxication is a type of food poisoning which occasionally results from eating turtles, particularly marine turtles, in the region of the Atlantic, Pacific and Indian Oceans. It is considered rare.

== Epidemiology ==
Four species of marine turtle have been associated with chelonitoxism: hawksbill turtle (Eretmochelys imbricata), green sea turtle (Chelonia mydas), loggerhead sea turtle (Caretta caretta gigas), leatherback sea turtle (Dermochelys coriacea), plus the freshwater species New Guinea giant softshell turtle (Pelochelys bibroni). Consumption of these species has caused poisoning incidents at various times of year in various tropical and subtropical locations, including such places as Southeast Asia, Indonesia, the Philippines and New Guinea, as well as southern South Asia (Gulf of Mannar) and the Zanzibar archipelago. The southern South Asia region has recorded 89 deaths from (primarily hawksbill and green) sea turtle poisoning from 1840 to 1983, mainly in Tamil Nadu and northern and western Sri Lanka. Sea turtle is a traditional food in the region of the Western Pacific and Indian Oceans.

== Signs and symptoms ==
Symptoms of chelonitoxism begin to show up within hours to a week following ingestion of turtle meat which has not been repeatedly parboiled. Children are especially susceptible, and the toxins have been reported to transfer readily via breastfeeding, even when the mother experiences no illness.

Effects on the digestive system include nausea, vomiting, diarrhea, abdominal pain, dysphagia, tongue abnormalities, and a firm, nontender liver. Autopsies have revealed hemorrhage in the liver, esophagus, and stomach, with mucosal edema of the esophagus, stomach, and intestines. Fatty changes and necrosis of the liver were present. Other organs found to be abnormal on autopsy include a swollen gallbladder, congested kidneys, and enlarged spleen.

Effects on the cardiovascular system include variable slight tachycardia and a moderate drop in systolic blood pressure, pallor and, on autopsy, a flabby heart with hemorrhagic petechiae. Neurological signs include increased salivation, sweating, vertigo, lethargy, and diminished deep reflexes, sometimes followed by coma and death. Death was found to result from an inability to breathe. On autopsy, cerebral cortical edema was found, along with hemorrhagic petechiae. Low fever, thirst, constipation, and spontaneous abortion have also been reported, while typical signs of allergic reaction are absent.

== Diagnosis and treatment ==
Chelonitoxism can be deadly, and supportive treatment is the only treatment available; there is no known antidote. A full recovery can take weeks, and it is not known whether any aftereffects are permanent. While standard hospital toxicology screens detected no known toxins, the stomach contents of hospitalized patients fed to small laboratory animals killed the animals. Silas and Bastian have speculated that chelonitoxism may involve a neurotoxin.

Research on the biochemistry of both poisonous turtle tissues and tissues of patients with turtle poisoning is scant, and local medical practitioners have minimal treatment protocols for chelonitoxism at their disposal. With loggerheads (and other turtles under pressure from hunting) under legal protection against hunting, researchers hope that programs to discourage turtle consumption on health grounds may both increase turtle numbers and prevent human morbidity and mortality.
