= Chitose Aquarium =

Chitose Aquarium (サケのふるさと 千歳水族館)
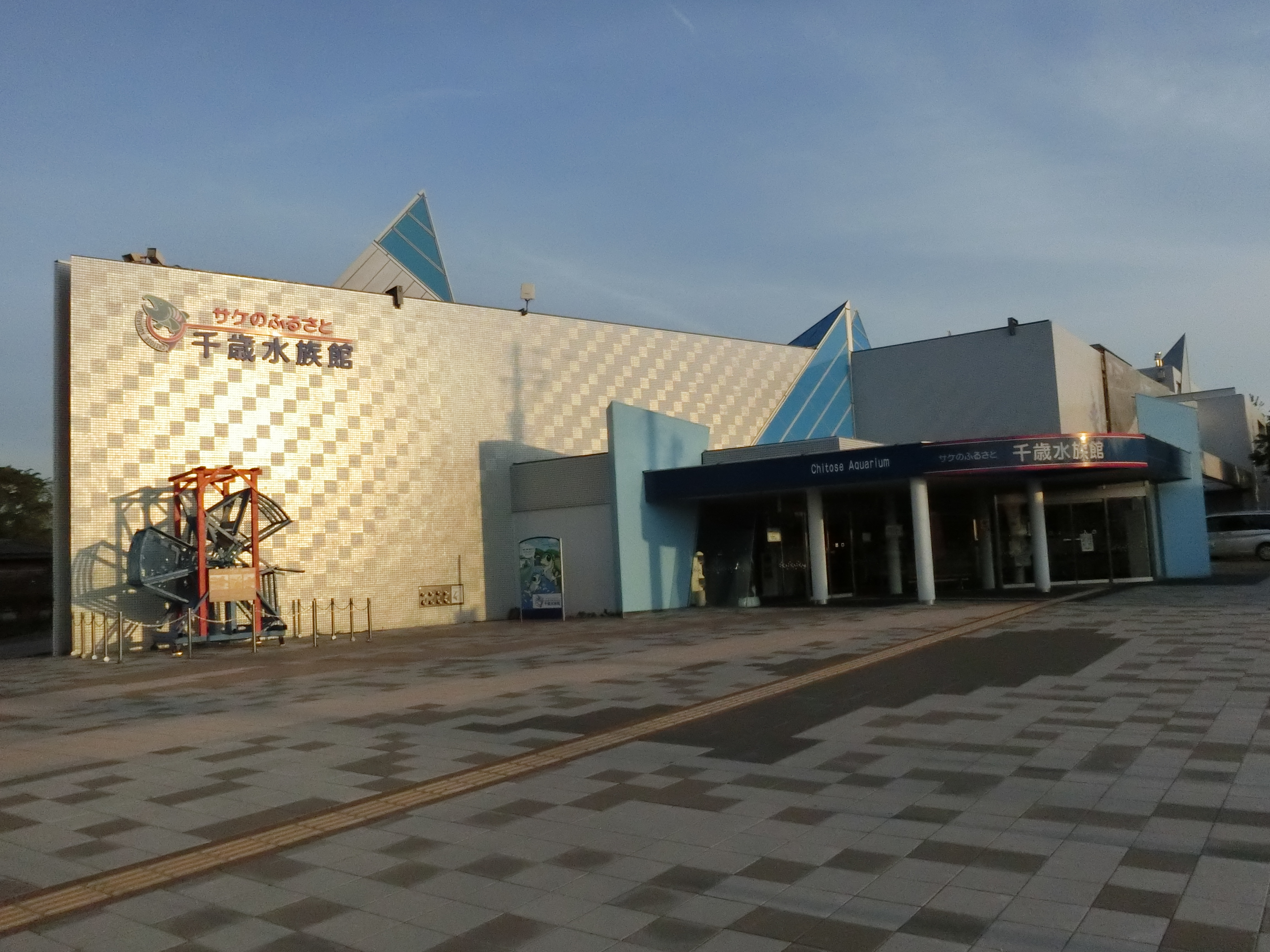
- Interactive map of Chitose Aquarium (サケのふるさと 千歳水族館)
- 36.7985°N 137.3881°E
- Date opened: 1994
- Location: Chitose, Hokkaido, Japan
- Land area: 2,992 m^{2} (32,210 sq ft)
- Volume of largest tank: 300,000 litres (79,000 US gal)
- Total volume of tanks: 600,000 litres (159,000 US gal)
- Annual visitors: 258.000
- Memberships: JAZA
- Management: Chitose Youth Education Foundation
- Website: https://chitose-aq.jp/map/underwater.html

Chitose Aquarium or The Salmon Hometown Chitose Aquarium (サケのふるさと 千歳水族館, Sake no furusato Chitose Suizokukan) is a public aquarium located in Chitose City, Hokkaido, Japan. The aquarium specializes in freshwater fish, Researching in salmon and sturgeon. It is a member of the Japanese Association of Zoos and Aquariums (JAZA), and the aquarium is accredited as a Museum-equivalent facilities by the Museum Act from Ministry of Education, Culture, Sports, Science and Technology.

== History ==
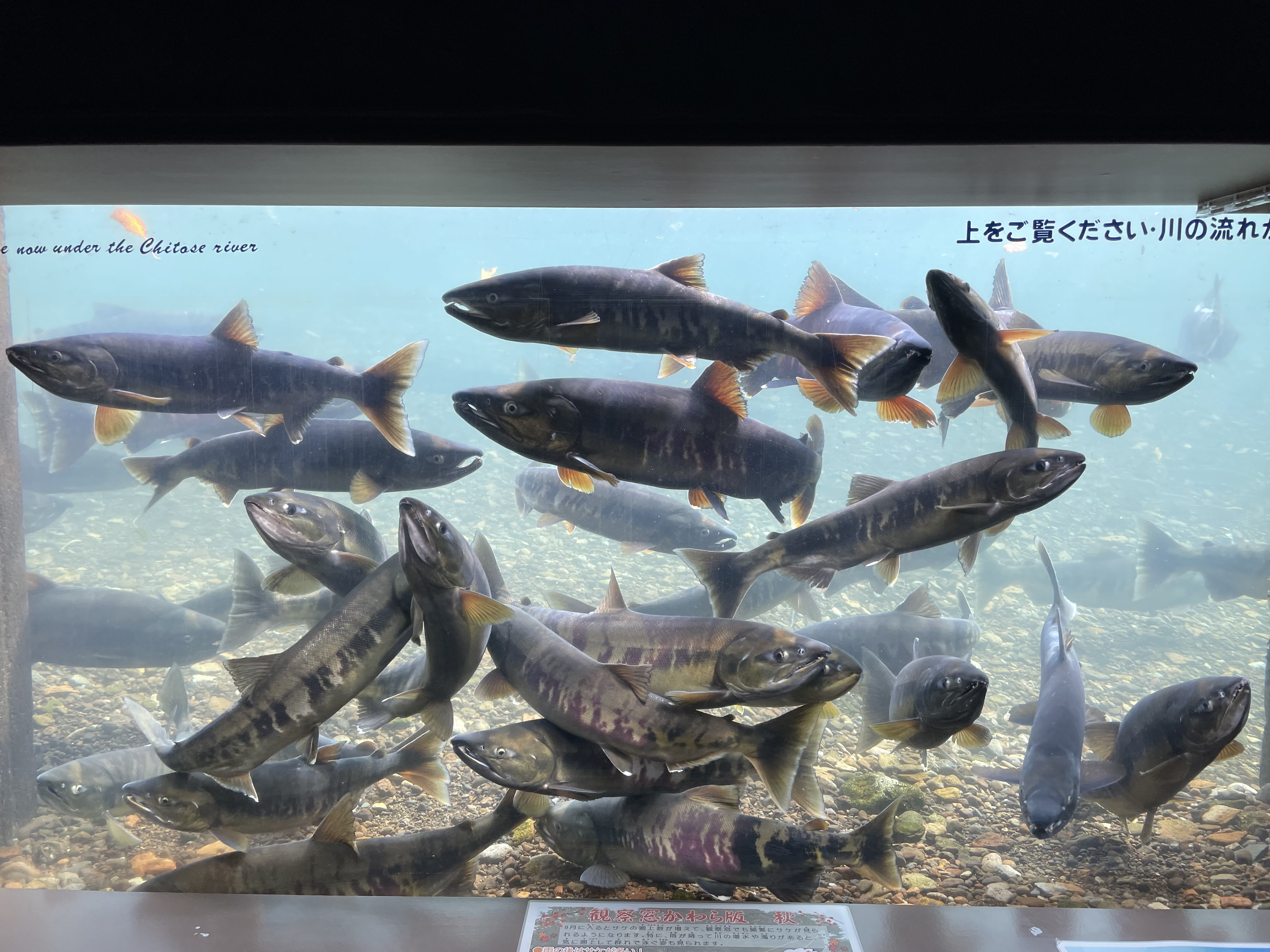
A school of salmon swimming in the underwater observation room.

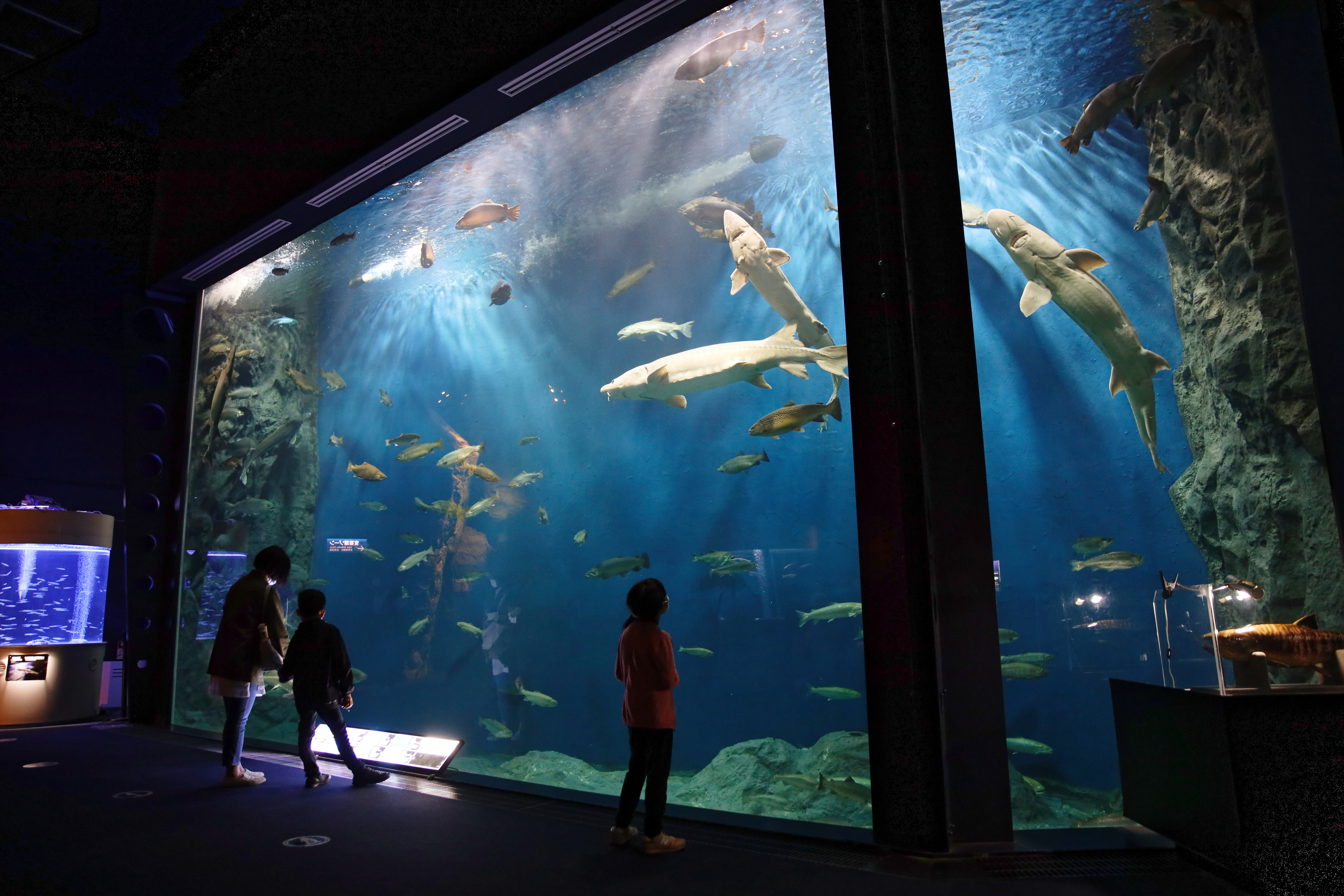
The large tank has a capacity of 300,000 litres (79,000 US gal) of water and was the largest tank dedicated to freshwater fish in Japan when it first opened.

In 1979, the "Salmon Park Basic Concept" was formulated and the Chitose Youth Education Foundation was established.

In 1991, the Chitose River Underwater Observation Room was completed. This facility is designed to observe and study the inside of the Chitose River, where groups of wild salmon can be observed swimming during the spawning season.

1994, the public aquarium Chitose Salmon Home Museum was opened.

In 1995, the museum was recognized as a museum equivalent facility by the Ministry of Education, Culture, Sports, Science and Technology.

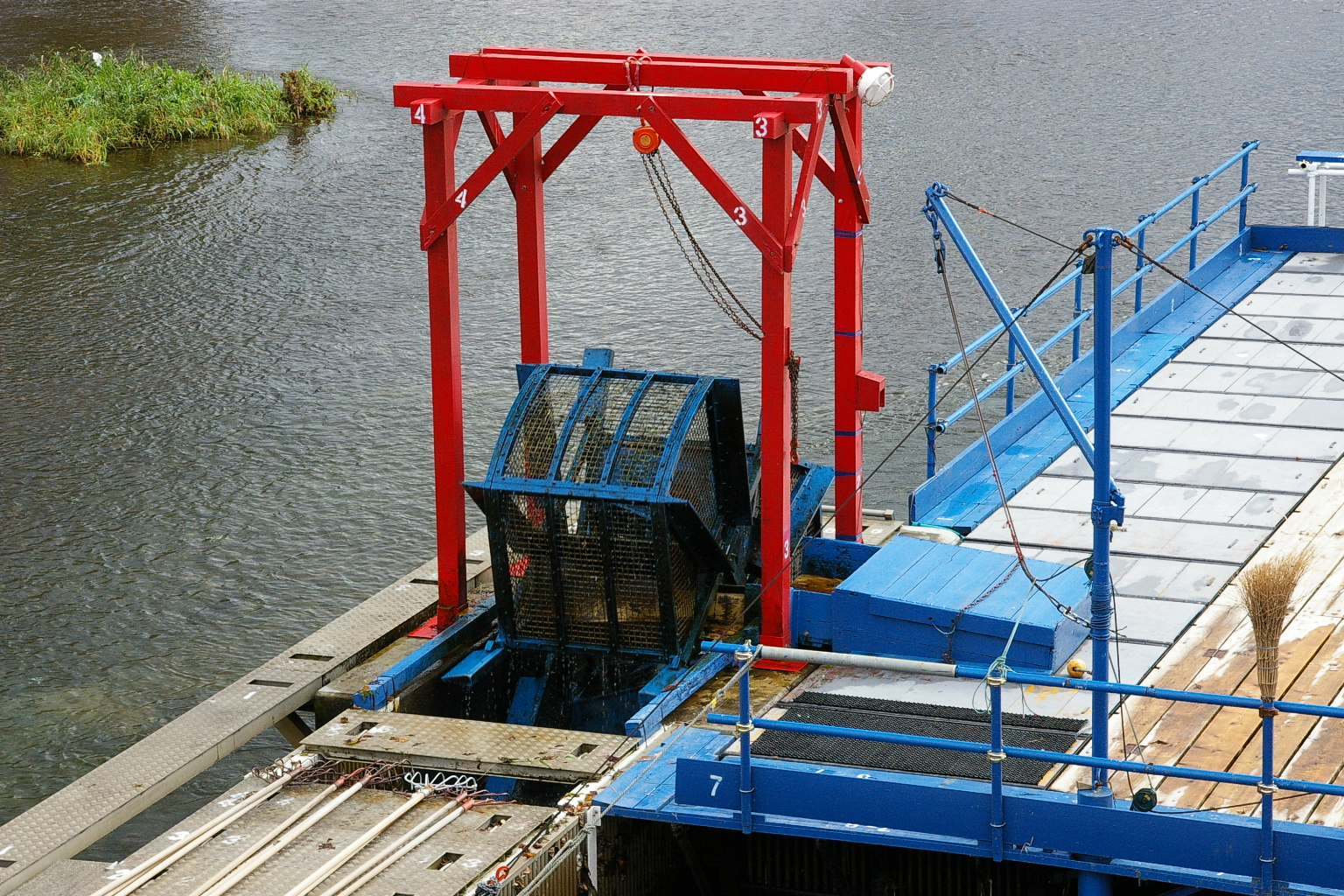
salmon wheel

salmon wheels are located on the Chitose River near the facility and are installed to capture parent fish for use in salmon and trout propagation projects. It is the only one of its kind in Hokkaido that runs purely on water power without electricity, and it is installed from mid-August to early December to capture the salmon that migrate upstream.

In 1888, when the salmon and trout hatchery was first established on the Chitose Rive salmon wheel were first located in the vicinity, and as the urban development progressed after the war, the number of visitors to the park increased. In 1994, the Aquarium was opened and a new salmon wheel was installed near the facility.

In 2012, the Chitose Youth Education Foundation was recognized as a public interest incorporated association.

In 2015, after being closed for construction, it reopened at the same time as the roadside station facility.

== Gallery ==
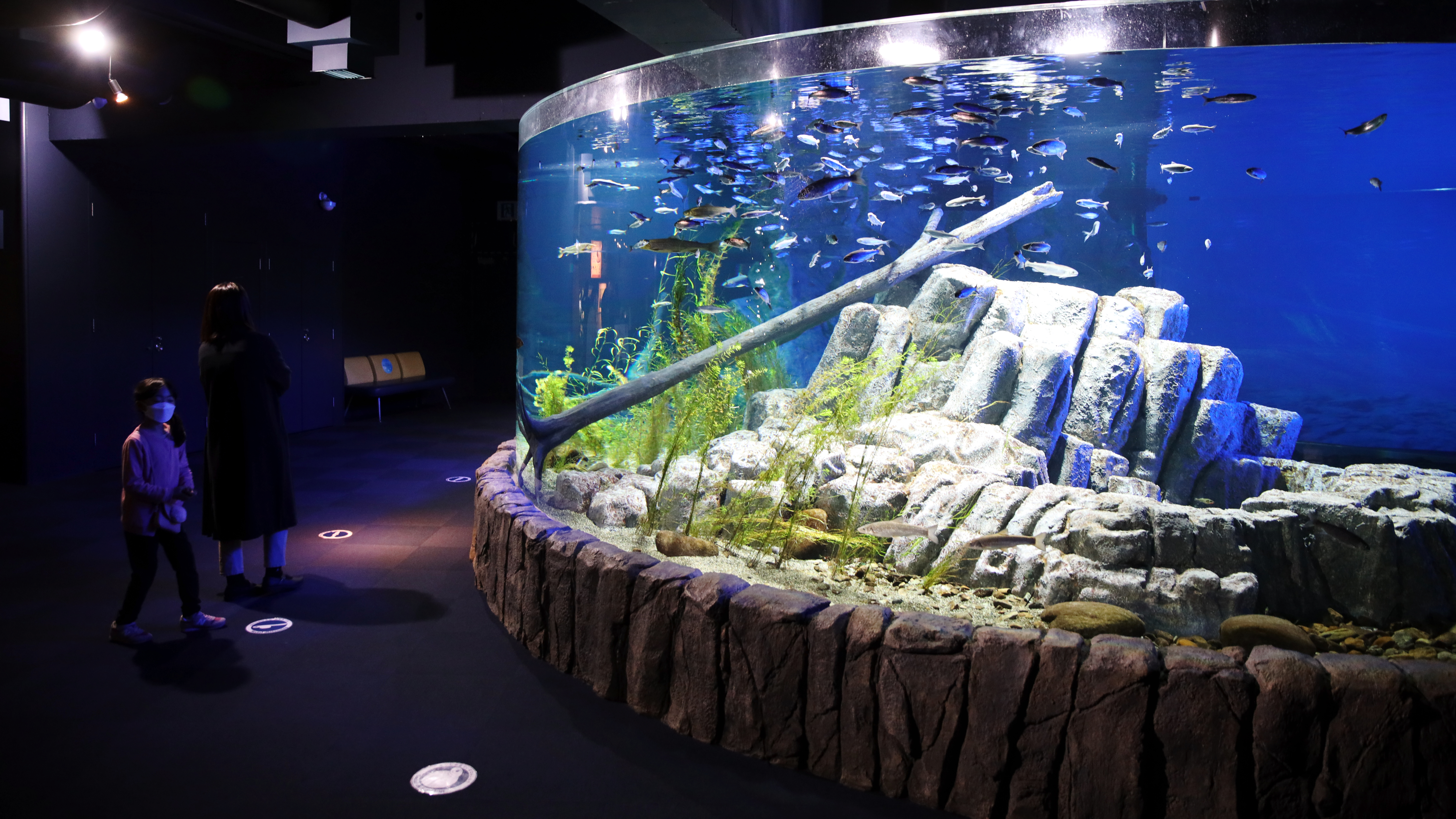

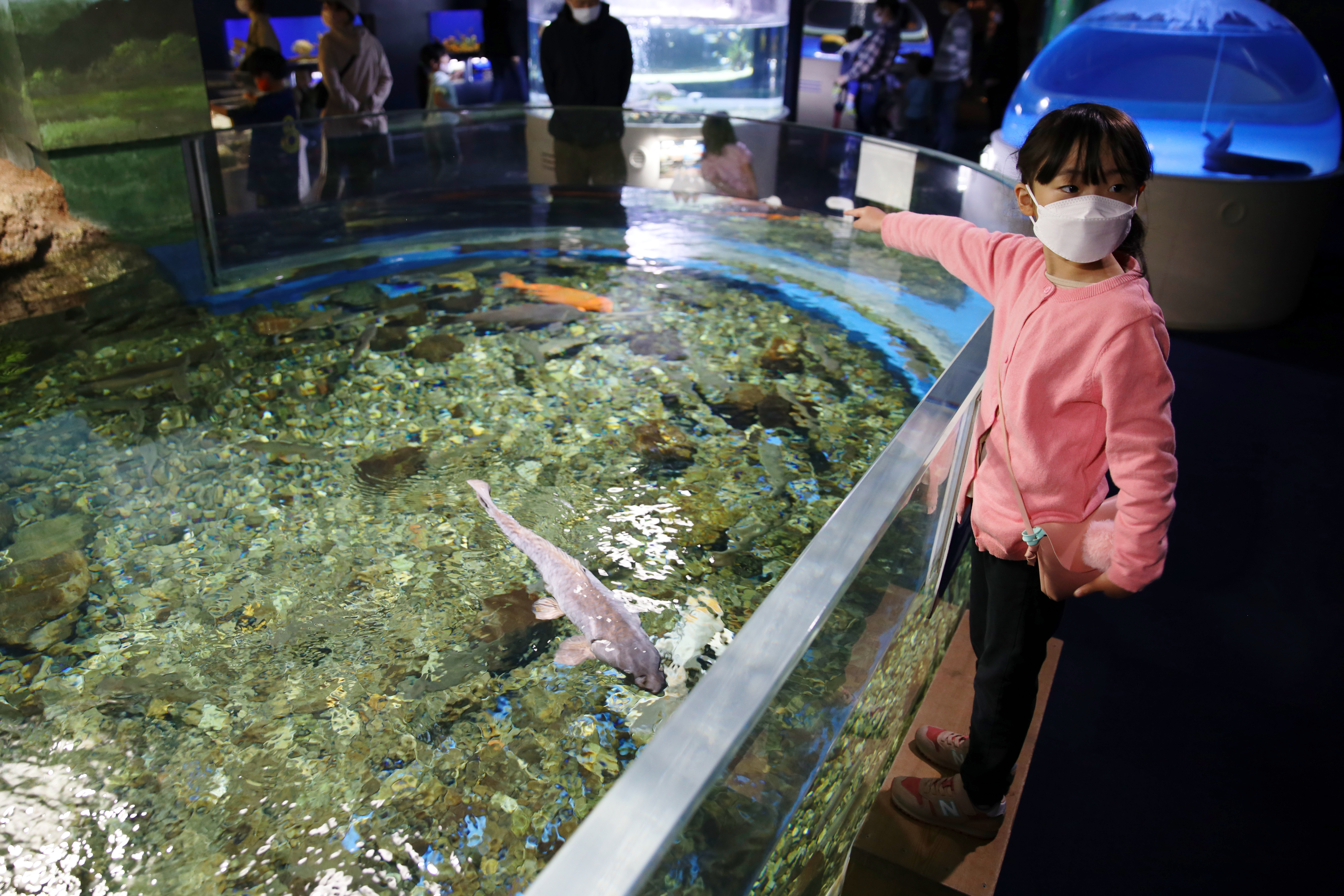

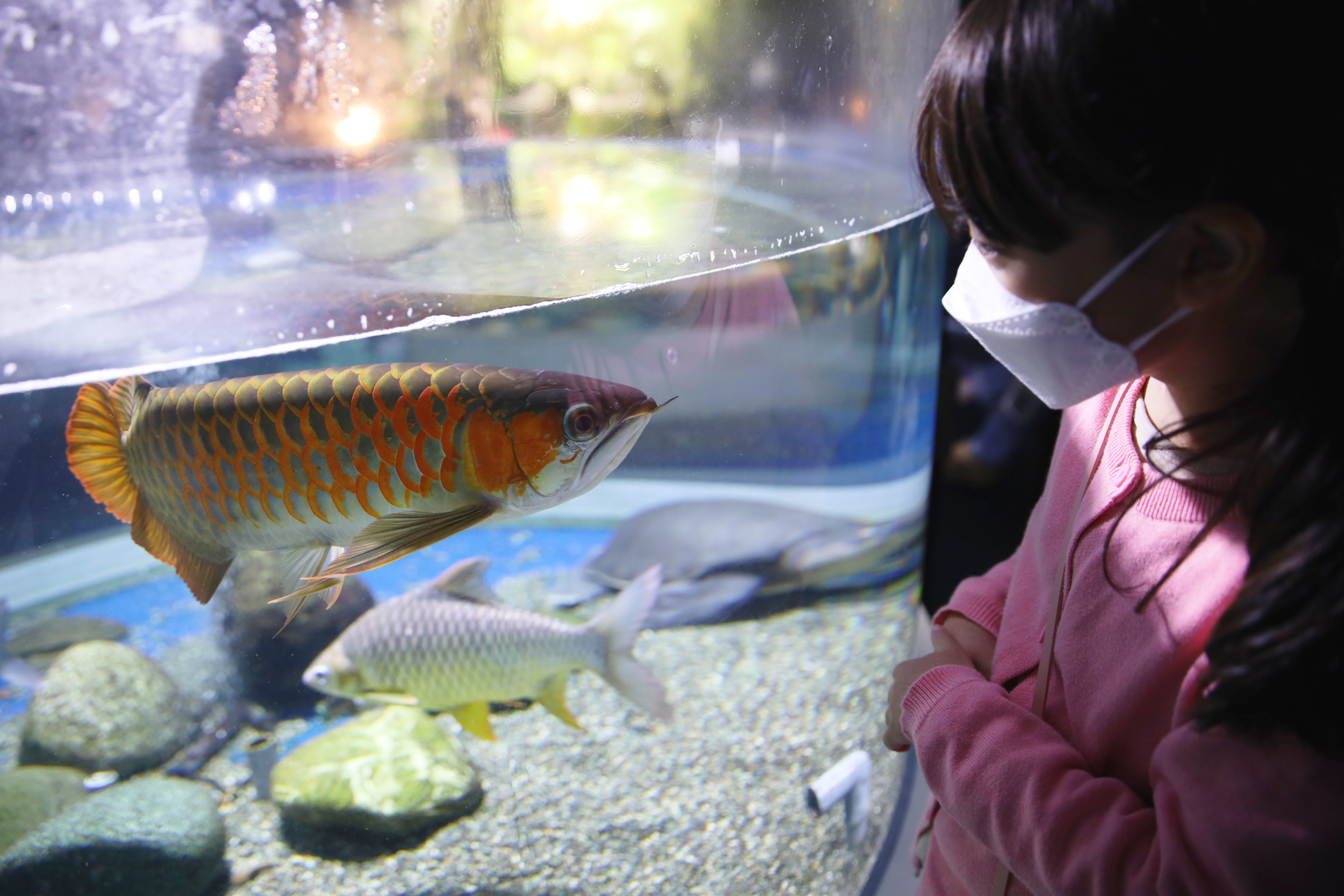

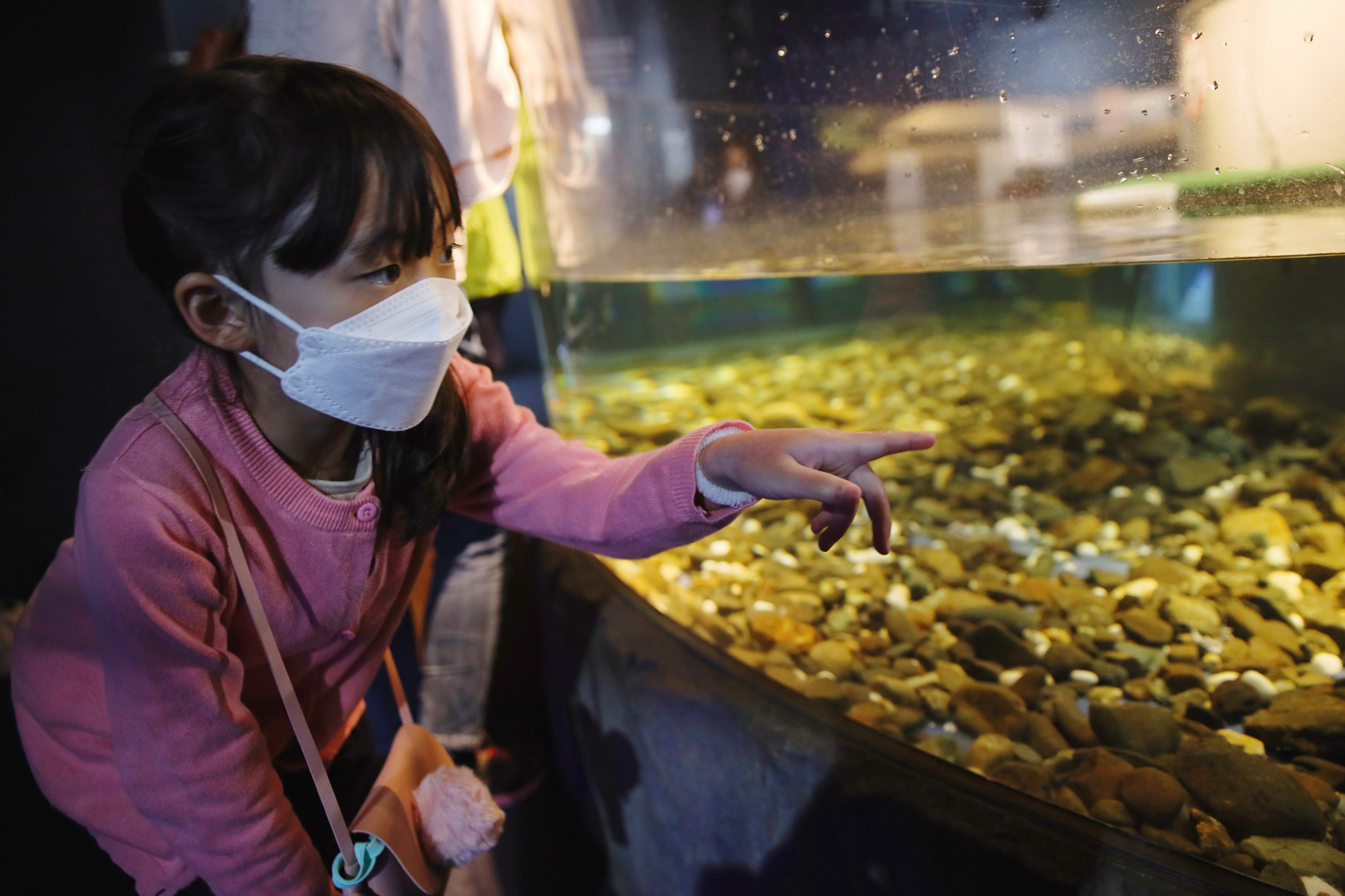

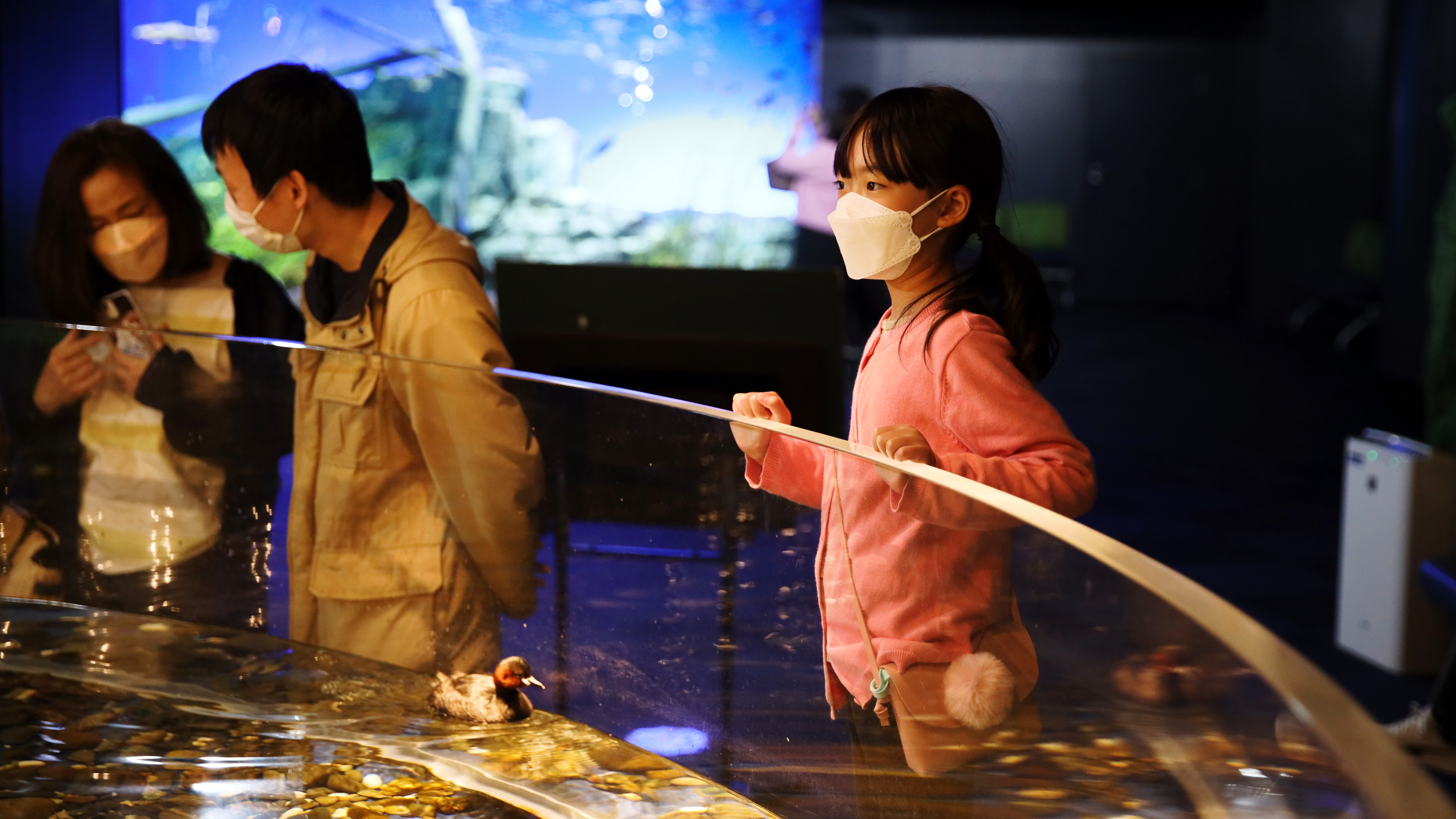

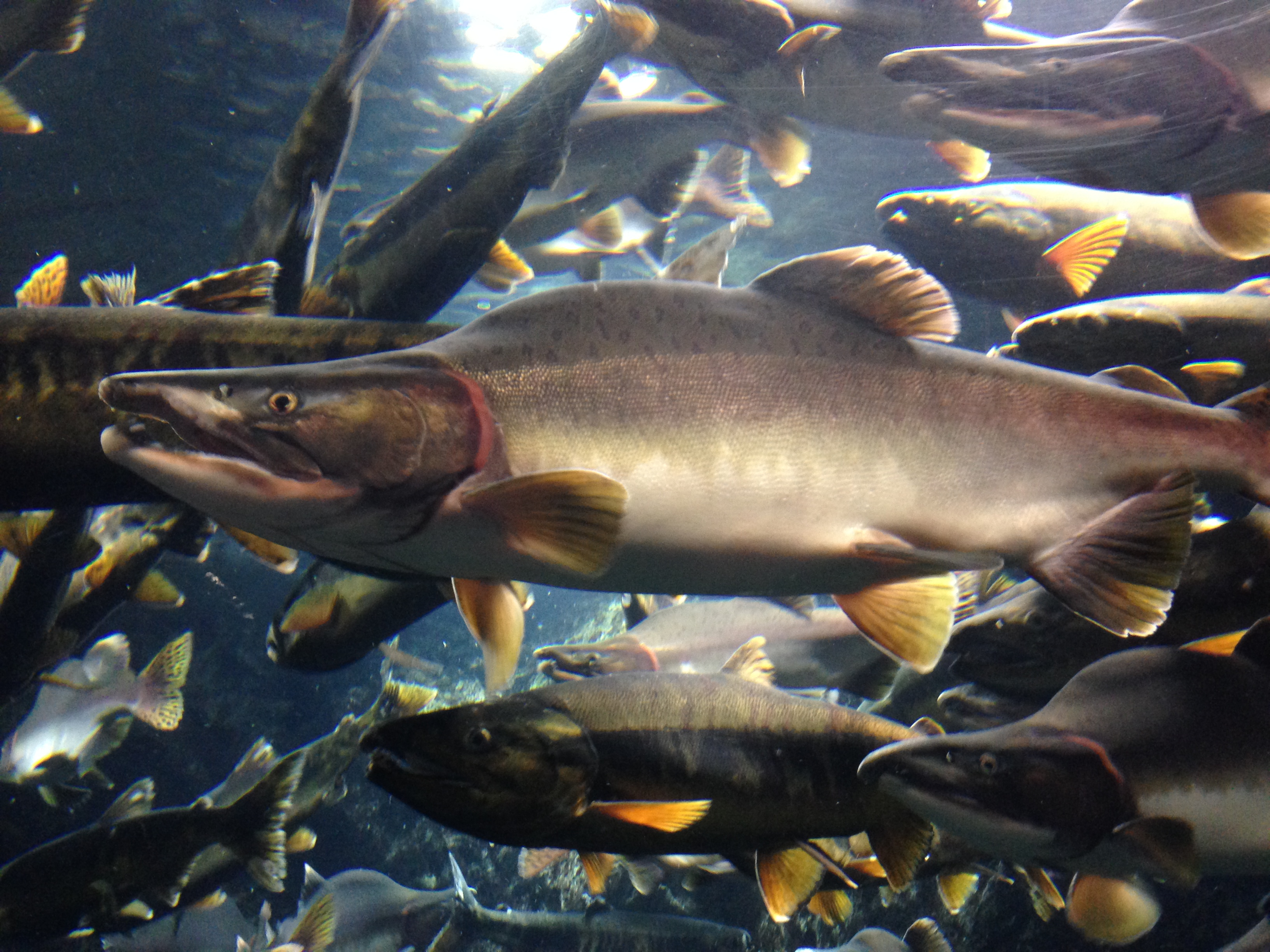

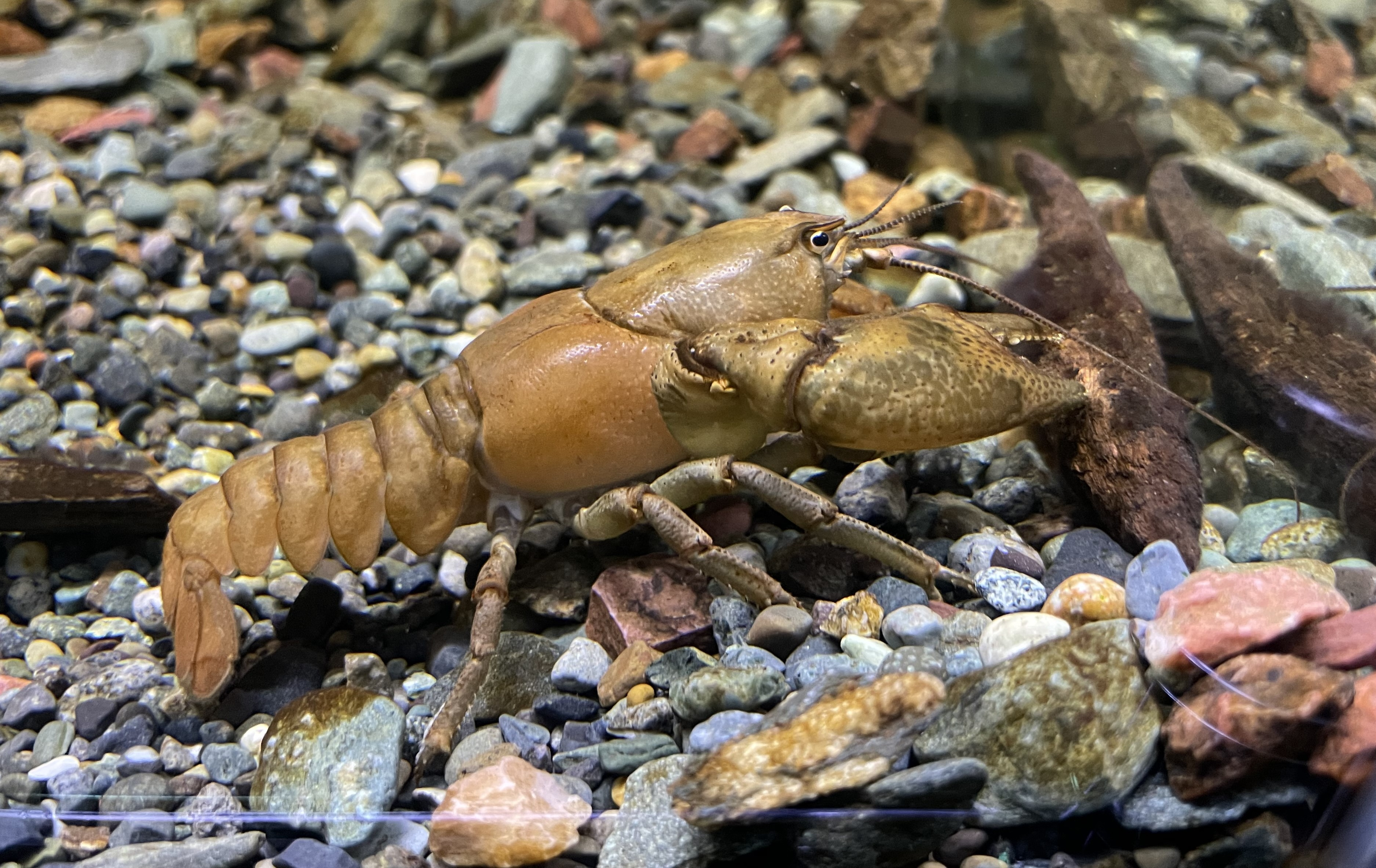

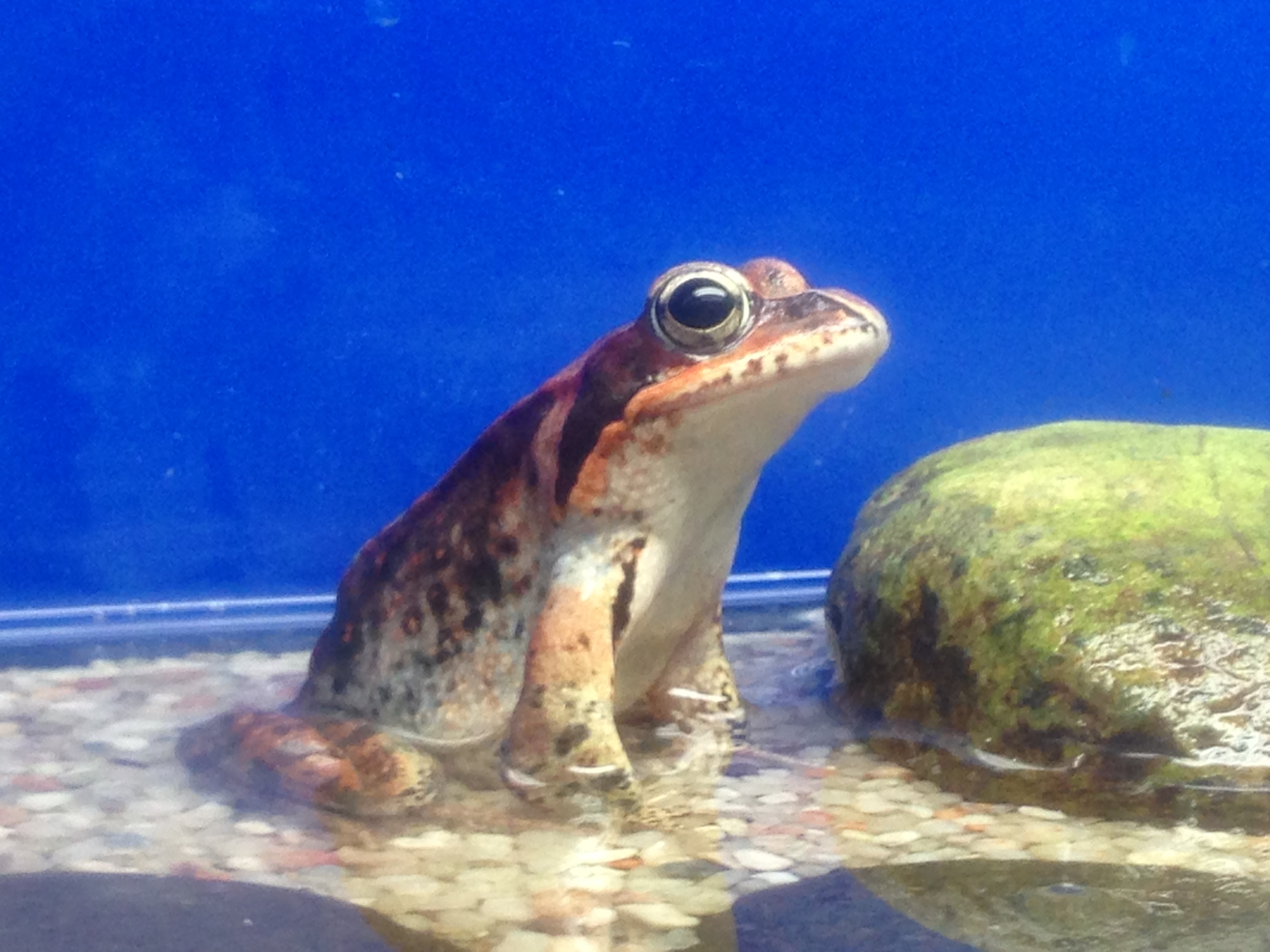
