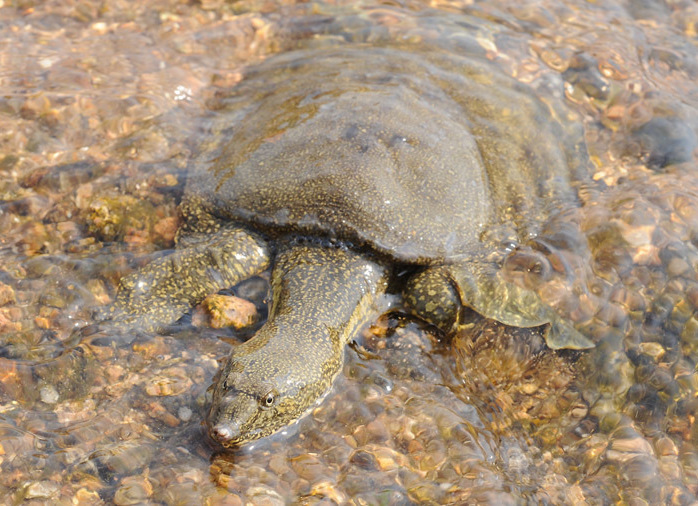

Conservation status
- CITES Appendix II

Scientific classification
- Kingdom: Animalia
- Phylum: Chordata
- Class: Reptilia
- Order: Testudines
- Suborder: Cryptodira
- Family: Trionychidae
- Genus: Pelodiscus
- Species: P. maackii

Binomial name
- Pelodiscus maackii (Brandt, 1857)

Synonyms
- Trionyx maackii Brandt, 1857; Amyda maackii Stejneger, 1907; Trionyx maachii Stanley, 1914 (ex errore); Trionyx maaki Chkhikvadze, 1987 (ex errore); Pelodiscus maackii David, 1994

= Amur softshell turtle =

Species of turtle

The Amur softshell turtle (Pelodiscus maackii), also commonly known as the northern Chinese softshell turtle, is a species of turtle in the family Trionychidae. The species is native to far eastern Asia.

== Systematics ==
The species was first described in 1857 by Johann Friedrich von Brandt, who placed the species in the genus Trionyx. The specific name maackii is in honor of naturalist Richard Maack, who explored the Amur and collected the holotype of the species. The type locality, as restricted by Leonhard Stejneger in 1907, (Note: Originally given (in Latin) by Brandt as "in the more southern rivers next to the Amur, namely the Sungari and Ussuri rivers, and also in the part of the Amur river between these rivers".) is "Southern Amur R. and Ussuri R.".

The species was moved to the genus Amyda in 1907 by Stejneger, but was subsequently synonymized with Pelodiscus sinensis up until 1987, when Vyacheslav Mikhailovich Chkhikvadze resurrected it. It was then moved to Pelodiscus in 1994 by Patrick David.

A 2022 molecular phylogeny study that mapped out the full mitochondrial genome of a member of the species found that Pelodiscus mackii and Pelodiscus sinensis are very closely related genetically.

== Description ==
The Amur softshell turtle is morphologically very similar to the Chinese softshell turtle (Pelodiscus sinensis), but can be distinguished by a greater maximum carapace length, over 35 cm (14 in) in P. maackii and 23 cm (9.1 in) in P. sinensis, and various differences in patterns and colouring.

== Ecology ==
The ecology of the Amur softshell turtle remained largely unstudied prior to 2026, when the first large-scale study entirely dedicated to the subject was published by Hou Xiaochen. The study found that the diet of the species varies heavily with size, the proportion of fish in it sharply increasing as the turtles get larger. Juveniles start out having diverse diets composed primarily of invertebrates, especially freshwater snails, before turning towards fish as their main source of food in the subadult and adult stages of their lives.

== Distribution and habitat ==
The Amur softshell turtle is native to far eastern Asia, being found in the Russian Far East, Northeast China, North Korea, South Korea and Japan, in the latter possibly as a result of introductions by humans. The species has also been introduced to the United States, being found on the Hawaiian island of Oahu.

It inhabits freshwater habitats, such as watercourses and swamps.
