= Southern New Guinea giant softshell turtle =

Conservation status
- Vulnerable (IUCN 3.1)
- CITES Appendix II

Scientific classification
- Kingdom: Animalia
- Phylum: Chordata
- Class: Reptilia
- Order: Testudines
- Suborder: Cryptodira
- Family: Trionychidae
- Genus: Pelochelys
- Species: P. bibroni

Binomial name
- Pelochelys bibroni (Owen, 1853)

Synonyms
- Trionyx (Gymnopus) bibroni Owen, 1853; Pelochelys bibronii [sic] Gray, 1864 (ex errore); Pelochelys bibroni — M.A. Smith, 1930; Triinyx bibroni — M.A. Smith, 1930

Species of turtle

The southern New Guinea giant softshell turtle (Pelochelys bibroni) is a species of softshell turtle in the family Trionychidae. The species is endemic to the lowlands of southern New Guinea with occasional vagrant individuals sighted off the coast of northern Australia. There is no confirmed Australian record. P. bibroni is referred to by the Suki people as kiya eise, a reference to its flexible shell. In the Arammba language, it is called sokrere, meaning "earthquake". It is sometimes hunted by local villages for its meat and/or eggs, leading to some cases of chelonitoxism.

== Habitat ==
P. bibroni prefers lowland rivers and estuaries, but adjusts well to the saline environments of deltas and large estuaries.

== Diet ==
The diet of P. bibroni is primarily carnivorous, consuming mostly fish, crabs, mollusks, and occasionally some vegetation. Its hunting strategy is not overly aggressive, but primarily being an ambush predator, it spends most of its time at the bottom of its chosen river bed, waiting for prey to wander by.

== Reproduction ==
Nesting of P. bibroni usually occurs in September, often on the same beaches as the pig-nosed turtle (Carettochelys insculpta). The 22–45 eggs in a clutch are often found in the nests of crocodiles. This is possibly a strategy to avoid nest predation.

== Etymology ==
The specific name, bibroni, is in honor of French herpetologist Gabriel Bibron.

== Geographic range ==
P. bibroni is endemic to New Guinea, where it is only found on the southern part of the island, south of the Central Range. In the past, there was some confusion about its range limits, but it is now clear that the species found throughout much of South and Southeast Asia is Cantor's giant softshell turtle (P. cantorii) and that the species in northern New Guinea is the northern New Guinea giant softshell turtle (P. signifera). The ranges of the species do not overlap anywhere.

Surprisingly enough, P. bibroni has some level of salt tolerance and is occasionally sighted in the offshore marine environment off southern New Guinea. Some individuals even manage to reach northern coastal Australia, with observers on the Australian coast occasionally sighting P. bibroni about once a decade (although no populations have yet been established). The lost holotype was even labeled as coming from Australia, although this is likely an error and it was most likely collected in New Guinea.

== Description ==
P. bibroni is among the largest species of freshwater turtle, surpassed or matched only by other species of Pelochelys, as well as certain Chitra, Rafetus, and Macrochelys species. P. bibroni can reach up to 1 m (3.3 ft) in straight carapace length, and 120 kg (260 lb) in weight.

It has a soft, subdermal carapace with a slightly flexible posterior region. Its neck is completely retractable, as are all four of its limbs. Its head is broad, with its nostrils at the end of a proboscis. Its digits are webbed, with eight digits on its fore limbs and five on its hind limbs. Its tail is very short.

== Possible chelonitoxism ==
P. bibroni is believed to be a species that, upon consumption by humans during certain seasons of the year, can lead to the phenomenon of chelonitoxism in a person. This may be due to certain phases in the turtle's diet.

== Threatened status ==
P. bibroni has a natural predator in the saltwater crocodile (Crocodilus porosus), but its current status as a threatened species stems from human activity. Locals often hunt the animal for its meat and eggs, and tribal masks can be crafted from its carapace. No commercial hunting is present, however. It is less threatened than its northern relative, P. signifera, which has to also contend with introduced fish species and have led to a significantly degraded habitat.
