= Northern New Guinea giant softshell turtle =

Conservation status
- Vulnerable (IUCN 3.1)
- CITES Appendix II (CITES)

Scientific classification
- Kingdom: Animalia
- Phylum: Chordata
- Class: Reptilia
- Order: Testudines
- Suborder: Cryptodira
- Family: Trionychidae
- Genus: Pelochelys
- Species: P. signifera

Binomial name
- Pelochelys signifera Webb, 2003

Synonyms
- Pelochelys signifera Webb, 2003

Species of turtle

The northern New Guinea giant softshell turtle (Pelochelys signifera) is a species of turtle found in the lowlands of northern New Guinea. South of the Central Range it is replaced by the closely related southern New Guinea giant softshell turtle (P. bibroni). It is threatened by overhunting and harvesting of eggs as well as significant habitat loss of aquatic vegetation due to introduced fish species such as the red-bellied pacu (Piaractus brachypomus).
