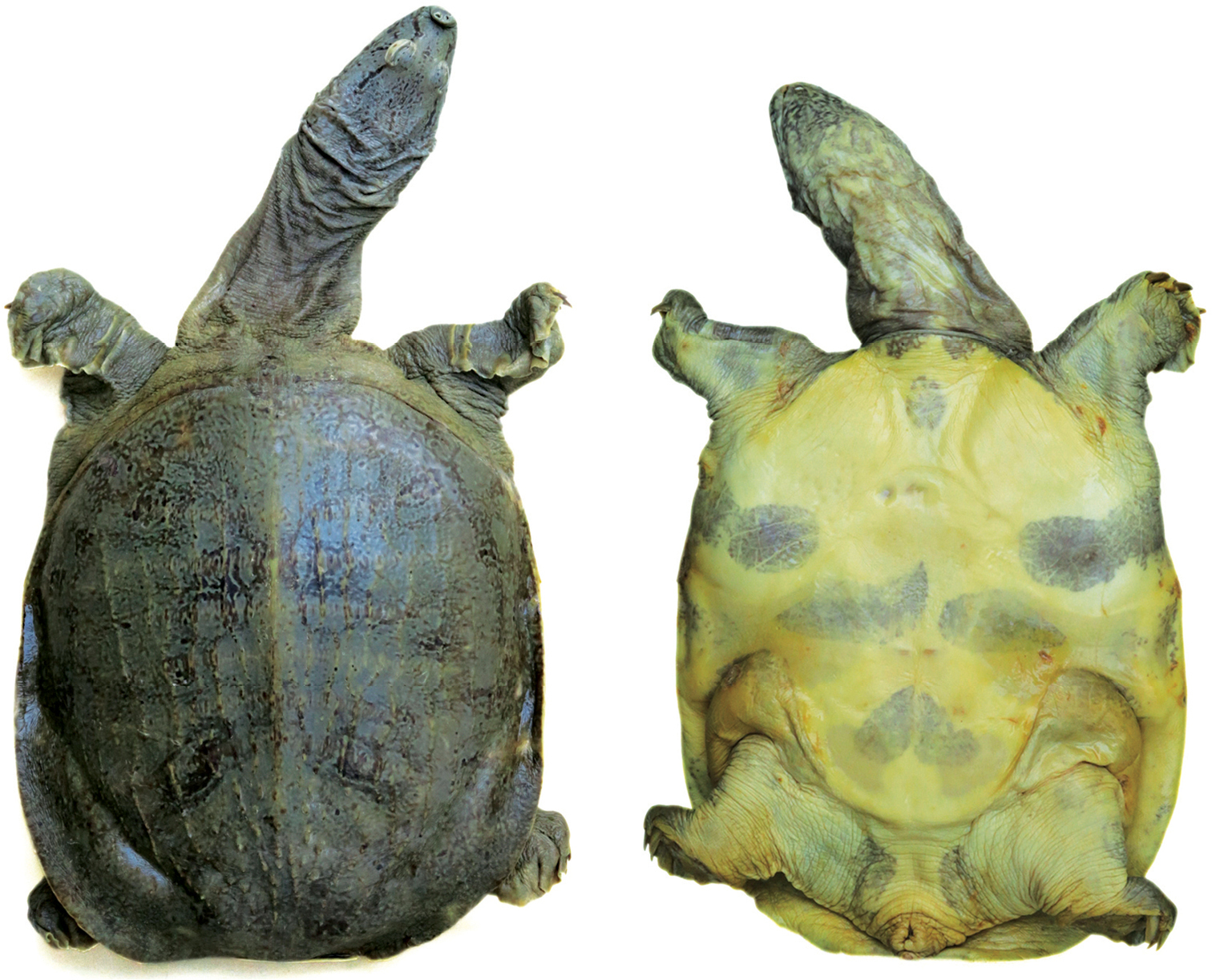

Conservation status
- CITES Appendix II

Scientific classification
- Kingdom: Animalia
- Phylum: Chordata
- Class: Reptilia
- Order: Testudines
- Suborder: Cryptodira
- Family: Trionychidae
- Genus: Pelodiscus
- Species: P. variegatus

Binomial name
- Pelodiscus variegatus Farkas et al., 2019

= Spotted softshell turtle =

Species of turtle

The spotted softshell turtle (Pelodiscus variegatus) is a species of turtle in the family Trionychidae. It is found in Indochina, where it is largely restricted to most of Vietnam; isolated populations belonging to Pelodiscus have been discovered in Hainan Island, some of which are considered spotted softshell turtles. Aside from genetic differences, this species can be most readily distinguished from other Pelodiscus by the large blotches on its plastron, which also gave it its name. Due to its restricted geographic range and the high level of human exploitation it is subject to, it has been proposed that this species be classified as Critically Endangered under the IUCN Red List.

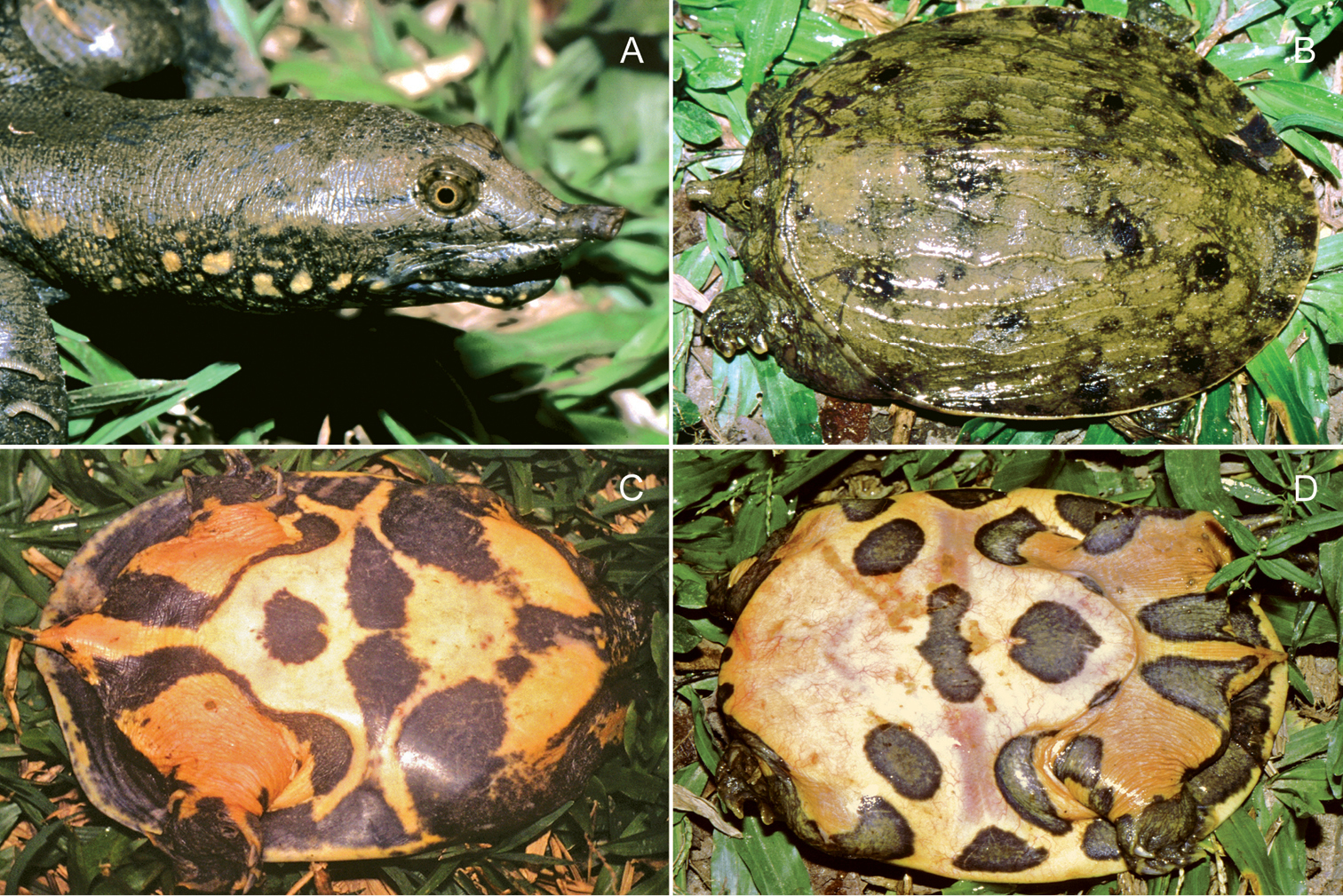

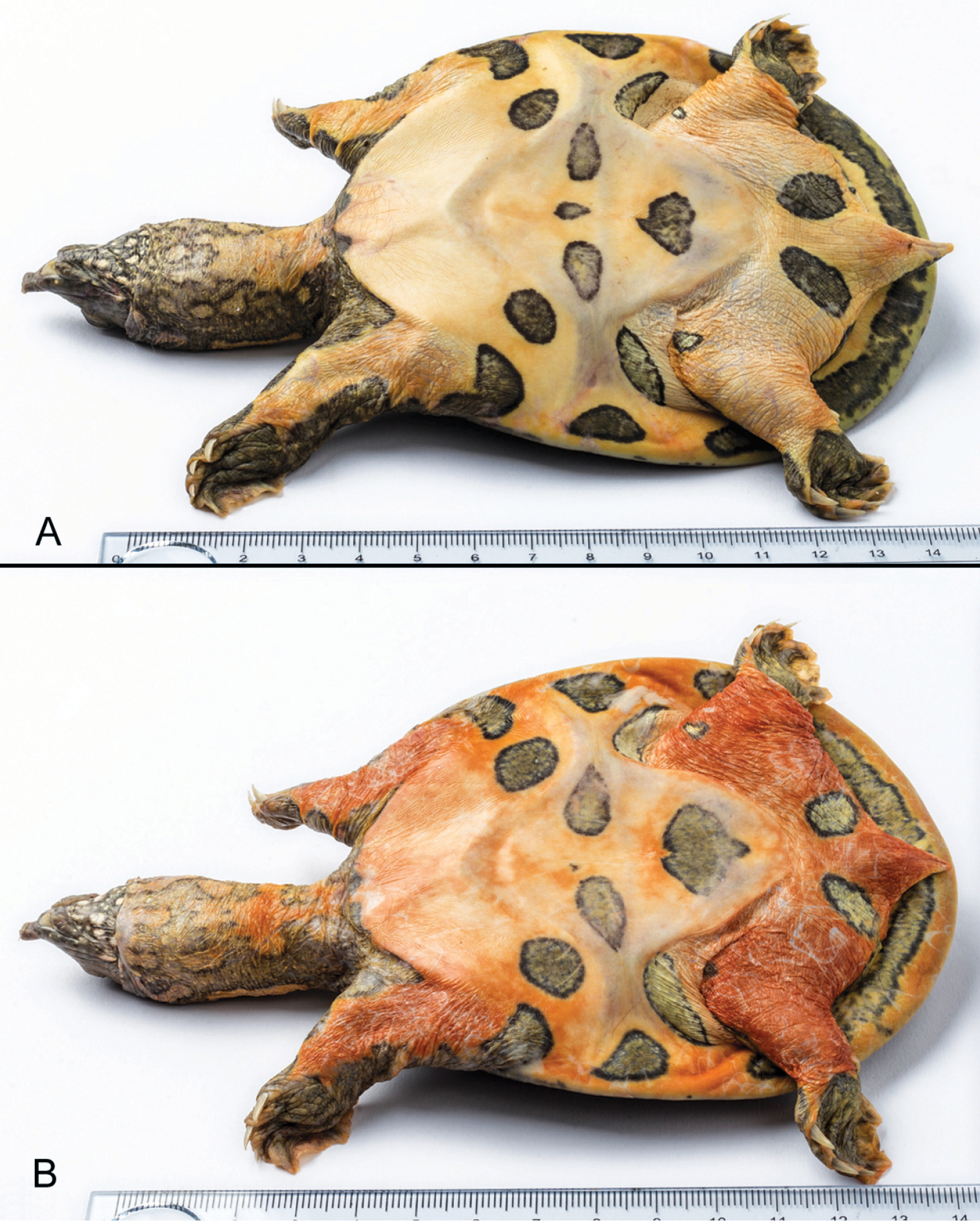

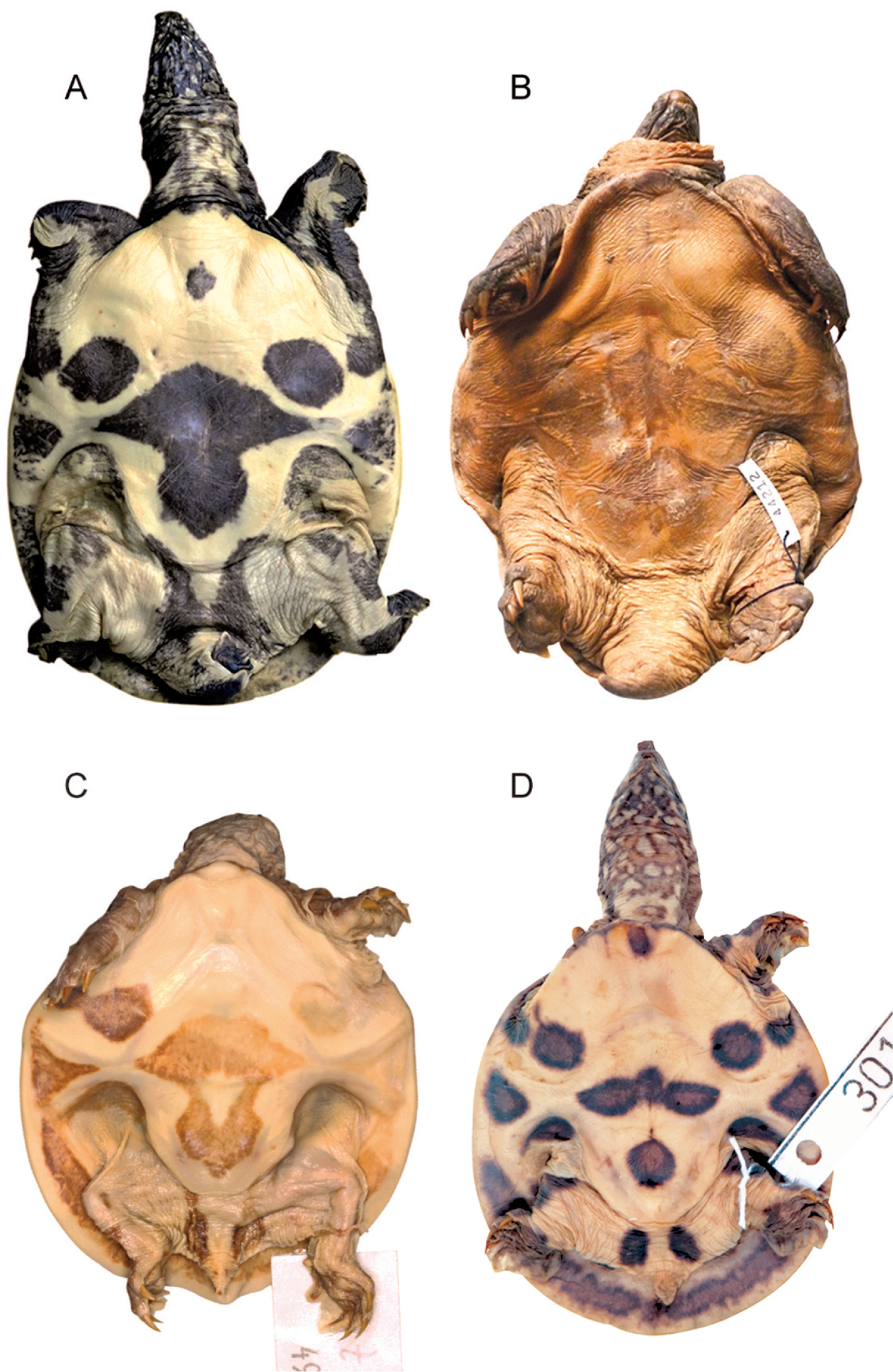
