= Hunan softshell turtle =

Conservation status
- Not evaluated (IUCN 2.3)
- CITES Appendix II

Scientific classification
- Kingdom: Animalia
- Phylum: Chordata
- Class: Reptilia
- Order: Testudines
- Suborder: Cryptodira
- Family: Trionychidae
- Genus: Pelodiscus
- Species: P. axenaria

Binomial name
- Pelodiscus axenaria (Zhou, Zhang & Fang 1991)

Synonyms
- Trionyx axenaria Zhou, Zhang & Fang, 1991; Pelodiscus axenaria — David, 1994; Pelodiscus axenarius — Bour, 2002

Species of turtle

The Hunan softshell turtle (Pelodiscus axenaria) is a species of turtle in the family Trionychidae, the softshells. It is endemic to China, where it occurs in Hunan, Guangdong, Guangxi, and Jiangxi provinces. It is found in Taoyuan, Pingjiang, Rucheng, Lingling, and Shaoyang counties of Hunan province (Zhou, Zhang & Fang, 1991).

The meaning of the epithet "axenaria" is unknown; Gong et al. (2022) suggested that it might be a misspelling of arenaria, which means "of sand" in Latin.
