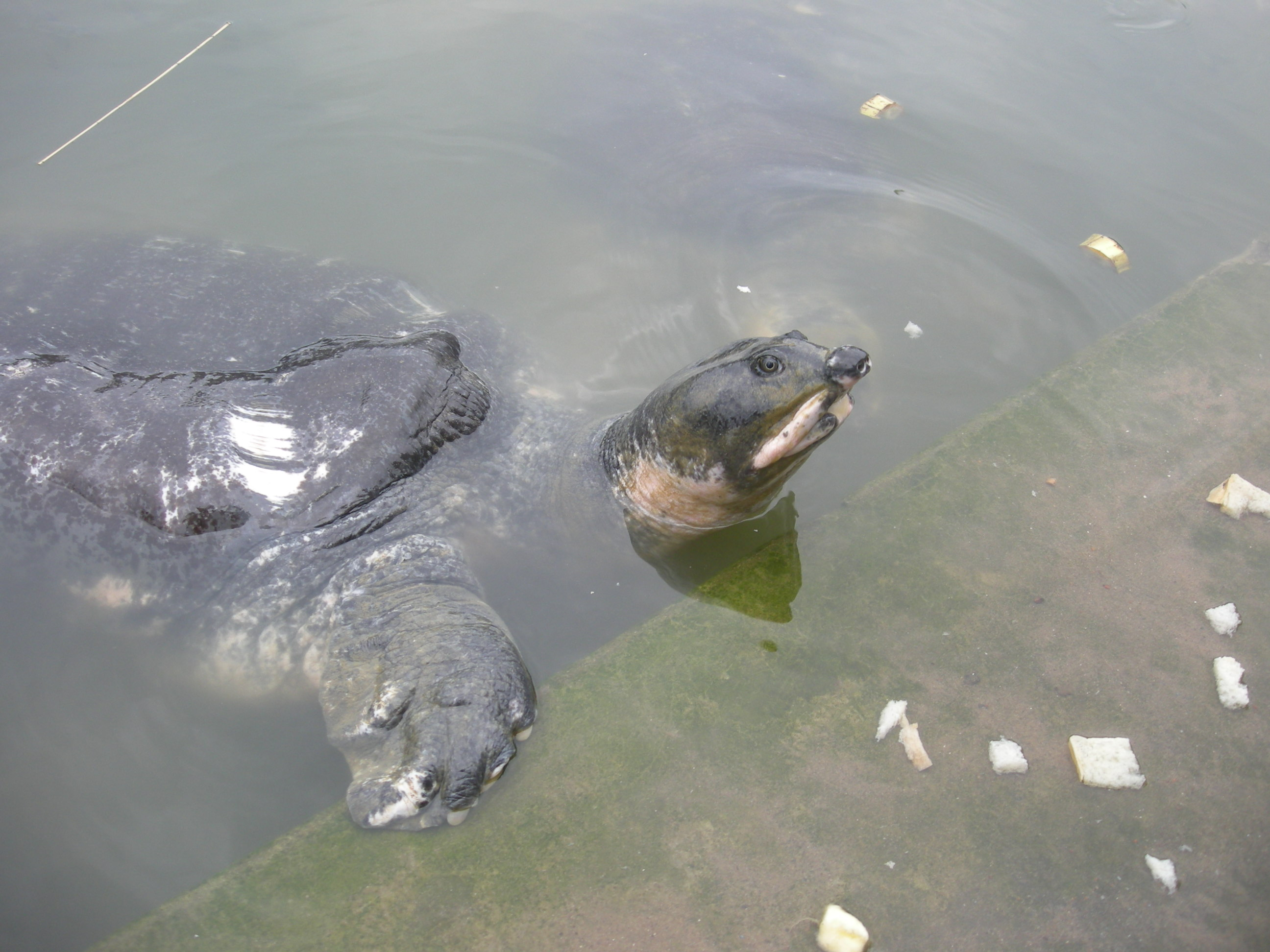

Conservation status
- Critically Endangered (IUCN 3.1)
- CITES Appendix I

Scientific classification
- Kingdom: Animalia
- Phylum: Chordata
- Class: Reptilia
- Order: Testudines
- Suborder: Cryptodira
- Family: Trionychidae
- Genus: Nilssonia
- Species: N. nigricans

Binomial name
- Nilssonia nigricans (Anderson, 1875)

Synonyms
- Trionyx nigricans Anderson, 1875; Amyda nigricans — Mertens, L. Müller & Rust, 1934; Aspideretes nigricans — Meylan, 1987; Trionix nigricans — Richard, 1999; Nilssonia nigricans — Praschag et al., 2007

= Black softshell turtle =

Species of turtle

The black softshell turtle or Bostami turtle or Mohan (Nilssonia nigricans), previously placed in genus Aspideretes, is a species of freshwater turtle found in India (Assam, Tripura and West Bengal) and Bangladesh (Chittagong and Sylhet). It was long believed to consist of inbred individuals of the Indian softshell turtle (N. gangetica) or the Indian peacock softshell turtle (N. hurum), but while it is a close relative of the latter, it is a distinct species.

In the 1800s, it was believed these turtles were brought from Iran to Chittagong shrine pond by Hazrat Bayezid Bostami. This turtles that he had brought to this pond were treated as sacred and respected by the public. It was also believed by following local tales related to the turtle, about the turtles once being Jinns (a mythological creature in Islam). Previously declared extinct by the International Union for Conservation of Nature in 2002, these turtles were found still to exist in a temple's pond called the Hayagriva Madhava Temple located in Assam, and in Kalyan Sagar lake in Tripura Sundari Temple in Udaipur, Tripura, India. Through conservation methods and protection of the species, some of these turtles can be found today throughout the wild, and scientists and environmental biologists are continuing to work hard to preserve this endangered species and their natural habitat. Their mitogenome represents relatedness to 19 other species of the Testudines. Nilssonia nigricans is the sister species of Nilssonia formosa.

== Habitat ==
Originally native to the lower Brahmaputra River, the only population ever reliably known consists of a number of the species in a man-made pond which is part of the Bayazid Bostami shrine at Chittagong, where they are dependent on humans for survival. To the locals and worshipers, the black softshell turtle is known as mazari ("Mazar inhabitant"); specimens from this shrine were used in the first scientific description.

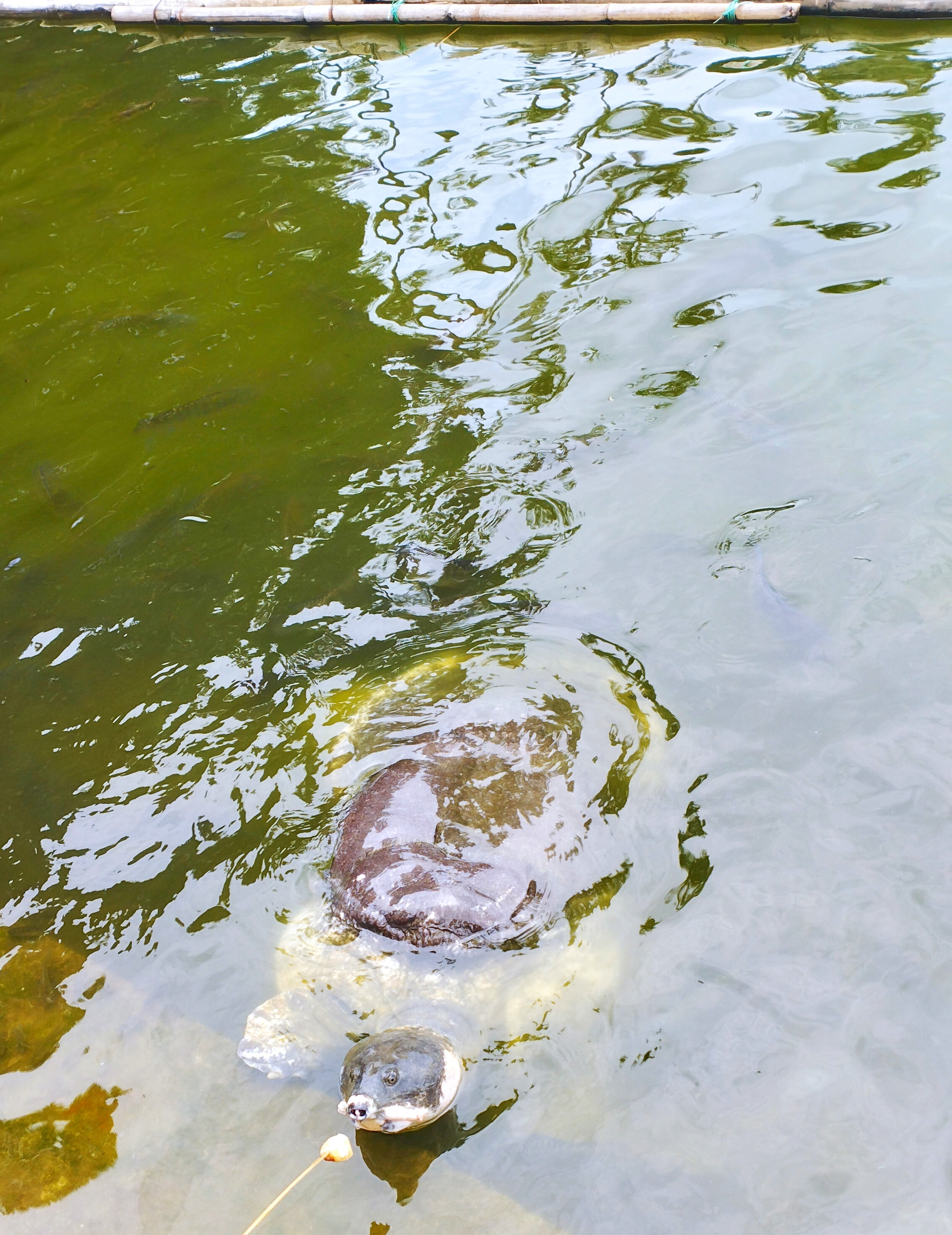
Being fed at the Bayazid Bostami shrine

In a 2014 survey by Poribesh Banchao Andolon, a Bangladeshi private organization it was found that the amount of oxygen dissolved in the pond water was 2.01 mg/L, whereas the favorable level is 5 mg/L. In 2012, wildlife biologists of the Center for Advanced Research in Natural Resources and Management found a small population in the wild of Sylhet. Two tiny wild populations were discovered in Assam, in Kaziranga and in the Jia Bhoroli River which is a northern tributary of the Brahmaputra. Also, another temple population of these turtles was identified in the Kasopukhuri pond on Nilachal Hill, next to the Kamakhya Temple at Guwahati in Assam. Another temple population is found in the kalyan sagar lake of Tripureshwari temple, Udaipur, Tripura. These turtles are also found in the pond in Baneswar Shiva temple, a shiva temple in Baneswar in the Cooch Behar II CD block in the Cooch Behar Sadar subdivision of the Cooch Behar district in West Bengal, India.

== Biology ==
=== Appearance ===
The black softshell turtle has an observably different appearance compared to that of a common turtle. This turtle, similar to all other softshell turtles, has a semi-flexible shell that is leathery, and does not obstruct movement as much as the average hardshell. The black softshell turtle also has a very distinct nose and face, with a tube like structure protruding from its nose resembling and functioning similar to a snorkel. The ligaments of this turtle are also much more distinct than those of the normal sea turtle or land tortoise, being that they have hand-like structures that are webbed, as opposed to other turtles like sea turtles who have a wider arm. The softshell of the turtle does not protrude out from the body very far, and typically appears somewhat rigid with very little color and design. The skin of the black softshell turtle is often black or dark brown, but can often appear with white to yellow spots that appear across the head and ligaments of the turtle.

=== Size and weight ===
The average Bostami turtle adult size can range from widths of 15 inches to 31 inches, and corresponding lengths of 13 inches to 28 inches. The average area of the species can range from 195 inches squared on the low end and 868 inches squared on the larger end. However, the highest recorded size for these turtles is a length of 35 inches. The weight for the average female is around 120 pounds, while the weight of the males has not yet been recorded. However, these males are visually larger indicating strong chances of a larger corresponding weight.

=== Life span and mortality rate ===
The highest recorded age for the Bostami turtle has been determined by those living in the area directly, with claims that the oldest turtles present are approximately 150 years old. However, this species has a high mortality rate at the beginning stages of life, with 94% of eggs without hatching capabilities. With an average clutch size of 20, this would allow for the survival of about one egg per two mating turtles.

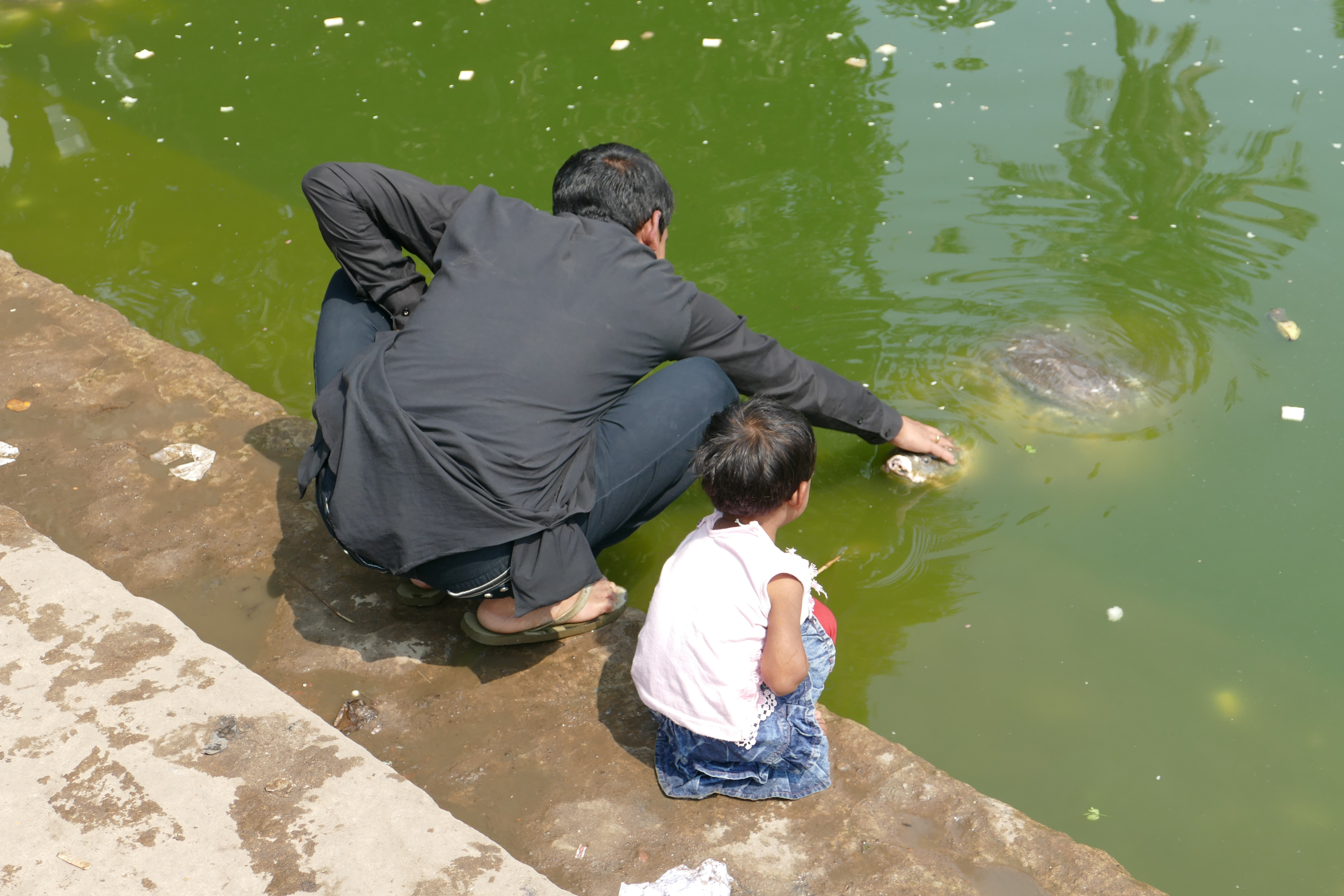
Visitors feeding the turtles in the pond.

=== Diet ===
With the species existing in very limited areas with high human traffic, these turtles have become dependent upon visitors for feeding. Visitors tend to feed a mixture of grains, fruits, and various meat products. These interactions with direct feeding have created a dependence for these turtles on the people, since this species no longer has a need for hunting. This had made it hard to determine the natural diet of the species. However, with the ability to consume the foods provided by the people, their diet is commonly compared to that of other species within the same genus. These organisms are on the omnivore scale of the food consumption, consisting of plants and small animals like fish and worms.

=== Reproduction ===
Nilssonia nigricans are oviparous organisms, in which they reproduce by laying their young as eggs to be hatched. Softshell turtles are known to mature slowly with the males prepared to breed in their fourth year. The female population could take up to seven to nine years to mature. A group of eggs is known as a clutch and a female black soft shelled turtle can lay anywhere between 10 and 38 eggs in her clutch. The baby turtles will grow in their eggs for 92–108 days before hatching. Recently the hatching rate for this specific species has been decreasing due to these species being endangered.

== Behavior ==
=== Hibernation ===
Hibernation takes place during the late autumn season until the spring for softshell turtles. They bury themselves at the bottom of a river/lake in the mud. Food is not as essential as oxygen during this period. Oxygen is needed at a reduced rate than normal and the turtles practice a technique called "pharyngeal breathing". This means that they pump water in and out of their throat (pharynx) that contain microvillus projections of small blood vessels. This structure provides them with greater surface area to absorb more oxygen.

== Near-extinction in the wilderness ==
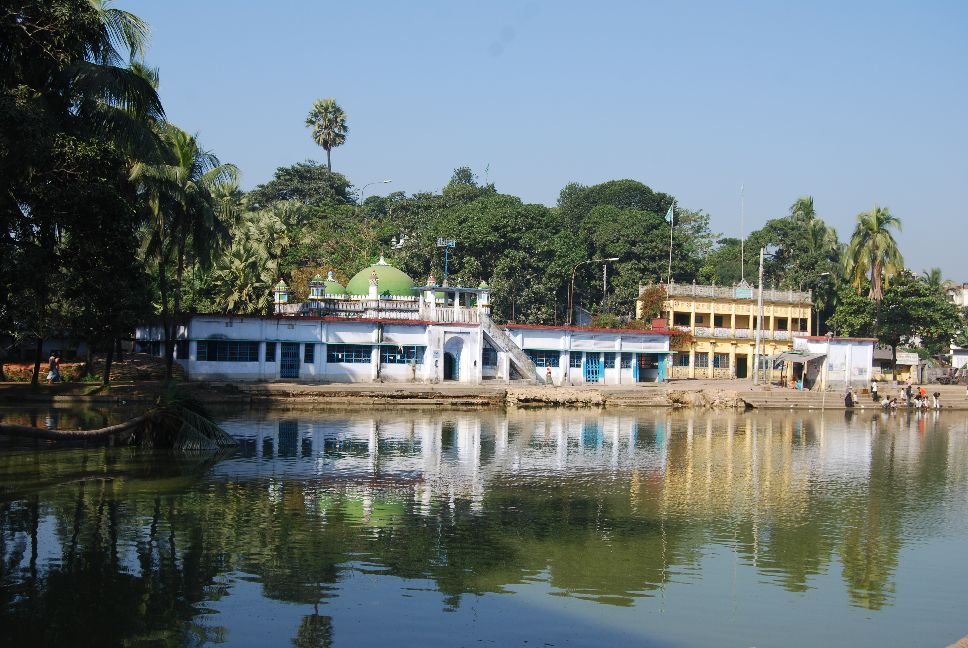
The Bayazid Bostami shrine with its pond

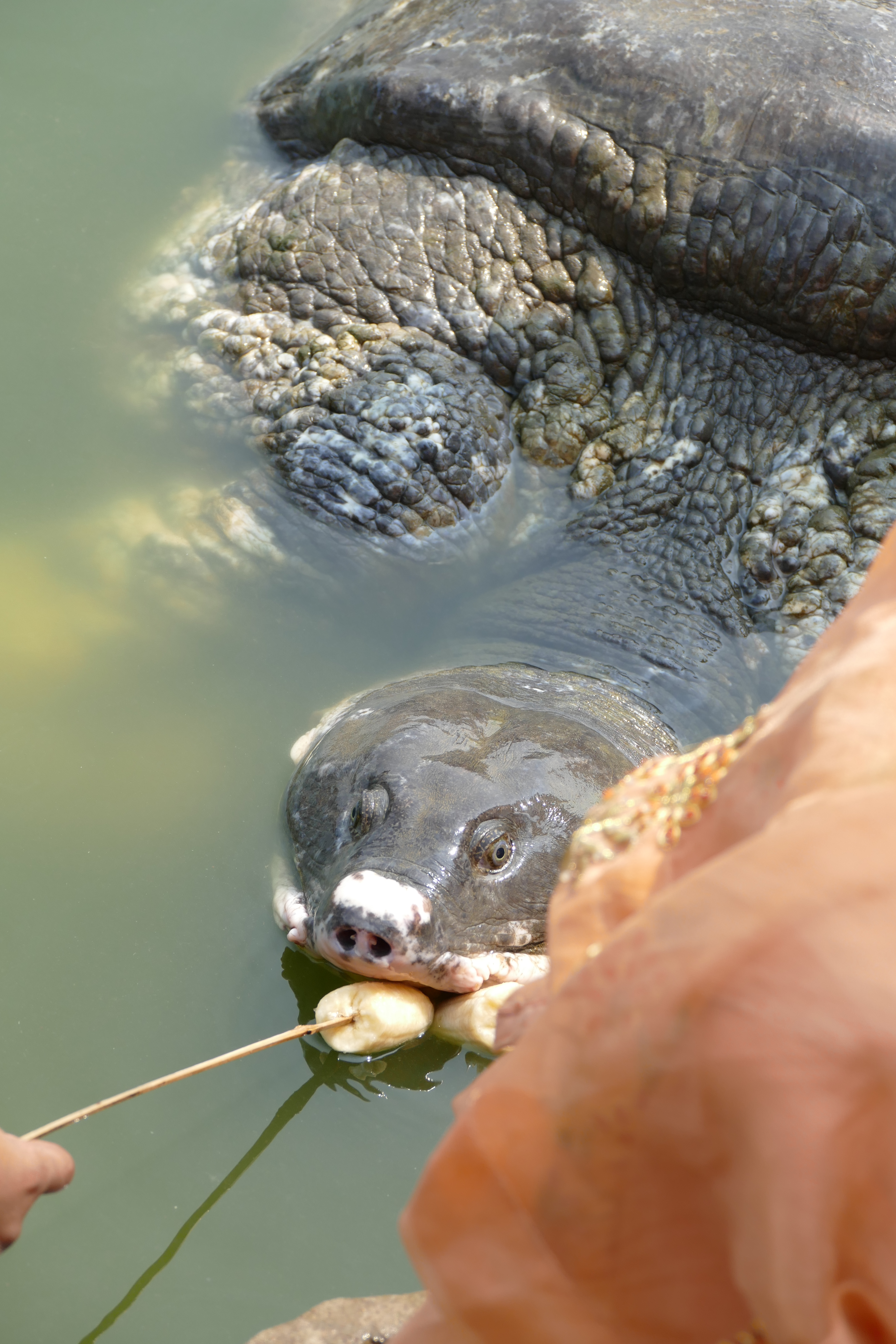
A Bostami turtle being fed by human visitors.

In 2002, the International Union for Conservation of Nature classified the species as Extinct in the Wild. In 2004, 408 turtles were found in the pond of the Bayazid Bostami shrine. According to the shrine committee staff, 90 more turtles were hatched in the pond in 2007, 74 in 2008, 96 in 2009, 28 in 2010, 45 in 2012 and 40 in 2014.

In 2017, a singular wild turtle was found in the wetlands of Old Akuk Village in Wokha District, Nagaland. DNA from the specimen sent to Bangladesh was tested and ultimately confirmed that it was a member of the black softshell species.

This extinction has been caused by human intervention, specifically the migration of people into the habitat and the contamination of water and land following this movement. The land of Bangladesh that N. nigricans have been able to occupy currently had been tested for conditions of survival and mating. The survival rate of juvenile N. nigricans is relatively low due to a low mortality of egg hatching and juvenile survival following hatching.

Human captivity of black softshell turtles for religious contexts seems to both benefit and harm turtle populations. Shrines keep these turtles in areas protected from outside predators, but these ponds are not suitable for sustained repopulation efforts. In Hinduism, the black softshell turtle represents an incarnation of the deity Kurma. Worshipers come and feed the turtles in the ponds human foods such as biscuits. Such dietary items are harmful to the turtles, often leading to malnourishment.

Human intervention has also caused a push towards extinction with intentional methods of poisoning. In 2006 there was a mass poisoning of the turtles within the Bostami Shrine pond by poachers in the area. This event occurred within the research period, as the turtles were under heavy observations and were protected from this event, while this not being the first time this method had been used. In this case many of the fish utilized by the N. nigricans for food had been poisoned, making nutrition unsustainable for the turtles. This same poisoning also changed the oxygen levels in the water, making it unsustainable for the turtles. A waiting period had passed to ensure oxygen levels were rich in the water, indicating a sustainable environment, in turn allowing the release of the species.

== Conservation efforts ==
Since 2013, TSA India has worked diligently to improve conditions at selected temple ponds in Assam where these turtles were discovered. Many of the ponds were eutrophic and overcrowded and often, turtles were fed human food as religious offerings. The turtles showed signs of poor nutrition and a lack of suitable nesting space resulted in eggs being deposited in areas where there was little chance of hatching. The goal of the project is to eventually rear and release juveniles from these captive colonies to supplement depleted wild populations. As part of that initiative, the TSA India team camped at the Nagshankar temple in April to observe nesting in the 40-45 adult females at that location. At that time, the team transferred ten nests to a hatchery and protected four nests onsite.

With TSA's efforts 44 turtles have hatched so far. The team is currently expanding a headstarting facility at Nagshankar temple to accommodate the turtle's hatchlings of 2016. Neonates and juveniles cannot be released back into the temple pond due to predation by larger turtles and exotic fish. For this reason, the team acquired an earthen pond in the nearest village to provide space for the fast-growing juveniles, improving survival prospects for this extremely rare softshell.

In 2018, Das et al. had collected population sizes of N. nigricans from 2006 to 2012. The population size had shown a gradual increase over time, indicating that the calculated area per turtle had decreased in accordance. He indicated that without an increase in habitat size, the carrying capacity of the species will be reached quicker. This can decrease the overall growth of the species and not allow it to grow past the current conservation status.

In 2011, Dr. Jayaditya from the Help Earth NGO found a grouping of black softshell turtles in a temple pond in Hajo, Assam. He revitalized contributions aimed towards saving and replenishing the species once again. He and his team embanked the sides of the temple pond and made adjustments to simulate a natural river system and create an ecosystem more conducive to the turtle's natural habitat. Thereafter, they observed a positive egg ratio produced around the temple premises. The State Zoo of Assam is playing an important role in this conservation project, serving as the location where baby turtles are reared for six months. When deemed fit and healthy, and capable of surviving, the young turtles are released into the wild. As of 2016, the State Zoo of Assam has released 300 turtles. Now 16 temples in Assam are helping in this important project. Similar conservation efforts have been undertaken in Tripura in Tripura sundari temple, matabari, udaipur, tripura, to protect the indigenous populations of Bostami turtles.

== Bibliography ==
- Rhodin, Anders G.J.; van Dijk, Peter Paul; Iverson, John B.; Shaffer, H. Bradley; Roger, Bour (2011-12-31). "Turtles of the world, 2011 update: Annotated checklist of taxonomy, synonymy, distribution and conservation status" (PDF). Chelonian Research Monographs. 5. Archived from the original (PDF) on 2012-01-31.
