= Indian softshell turtle (disambiguation) =

The Indian softshell turtle is a species of turtle in the genus Nilssonia. It may also refer to:

- Indian peacock softshell turtle (Nilssonia hurum), a species of softshell turtle found in Nepal, India, Bangladesh and Pakistan
- Indian narrow-headed softshell turtle (Chitra indica), or small-headed softshell turtle, an endangered species of softshell turtle found in South Asia
