= Trionyx javanicus =

Trionyx javanicus may refer to:

- Asiatic softshell turtle (Amyda cartilaginea), which has a synonym of Trionyx javanicus.
- Indian softshell turtle (Nilssonia gangetica), which has a synonym of Trionyx javanicus.
- Leith's softshell turtle (Nilssonia leithii), which has a synonym of Trionyx javanicus.
