= Shrine of Bayazid Bostami =

Shrine in Chittagong, Bangladesh

Coordinates: 22.38904°N 91.80919°E

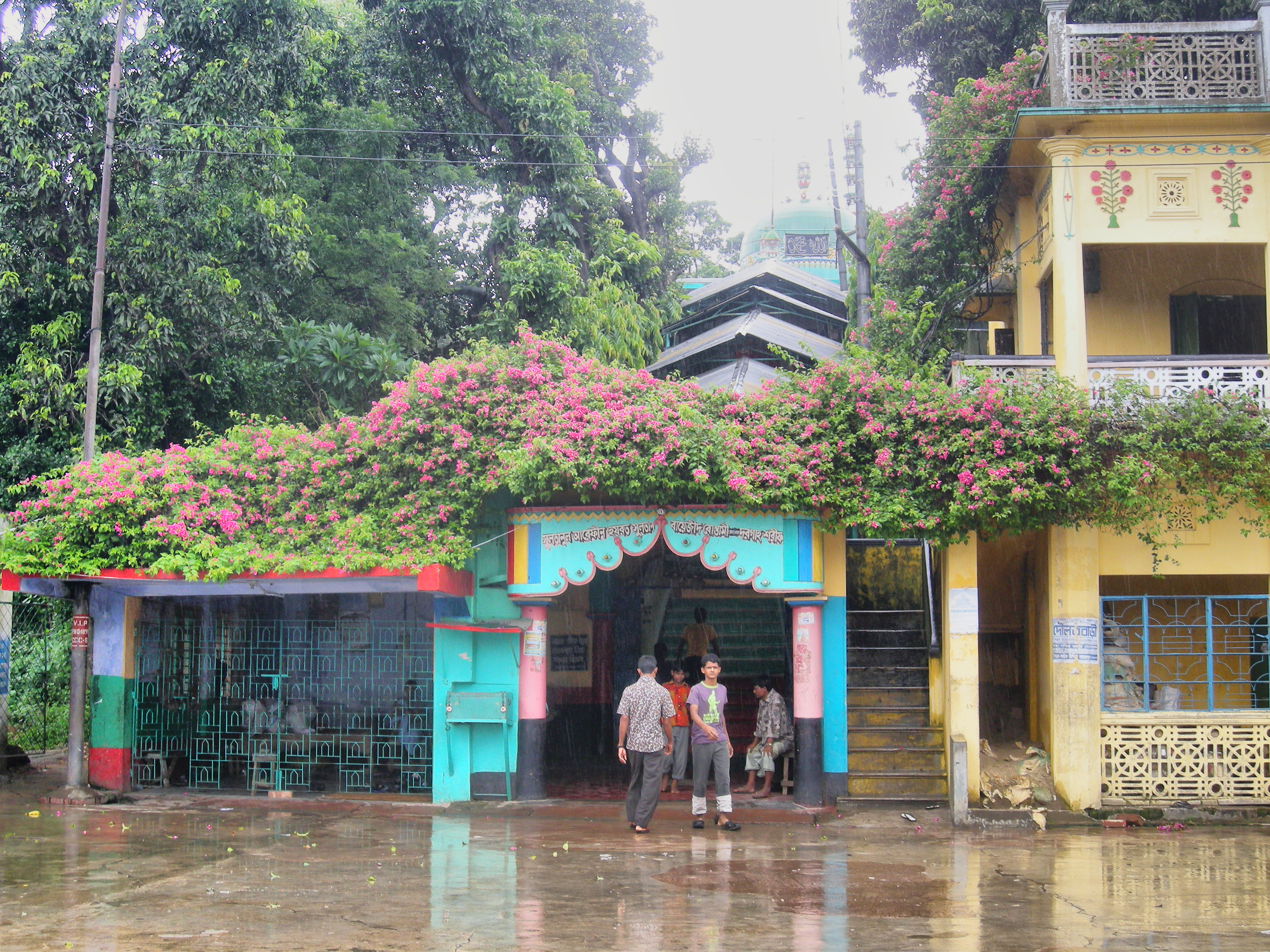
Entrance, stairs to the main tomb (2008)

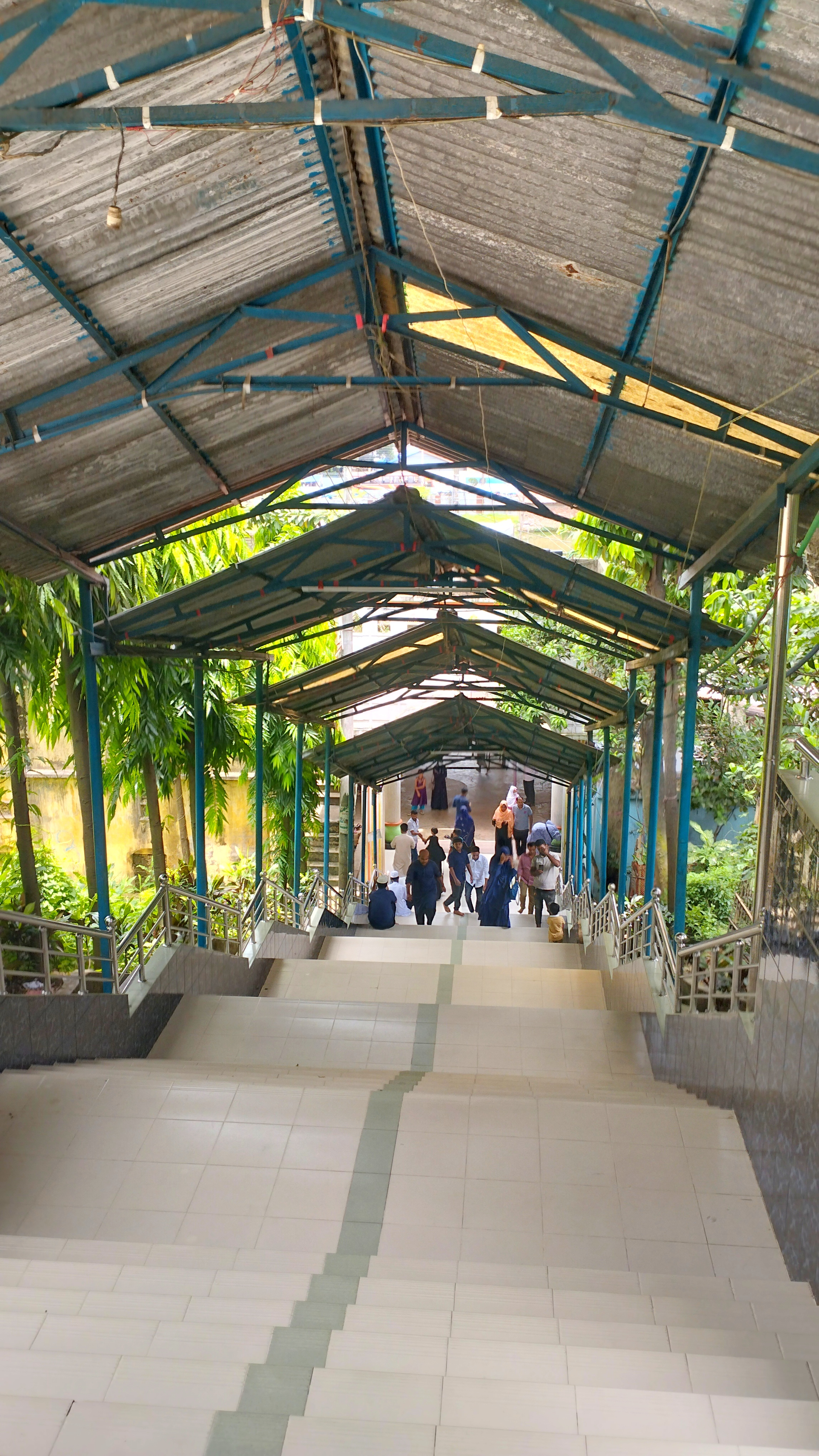
Stairs to the shrine of Bayezid Bostami (2022)

The Shrine of Bayazid Bostami is a shrine in Chattogram, Bangladesh. Bayazid Bostami was a famous Persian Sufi born in Bostam, Iran. Its shrine area as a complex consists of a tomb surrounded by a brick structure along with an old mosque and a large pond. There is no significant historical evidence about Bostami's visit and tomb in this area. The whole complex is located on a hillock of Nasirabad, considered to be a holy place and attracts a large number of visitors and pilgrims daily.

== History and description ==
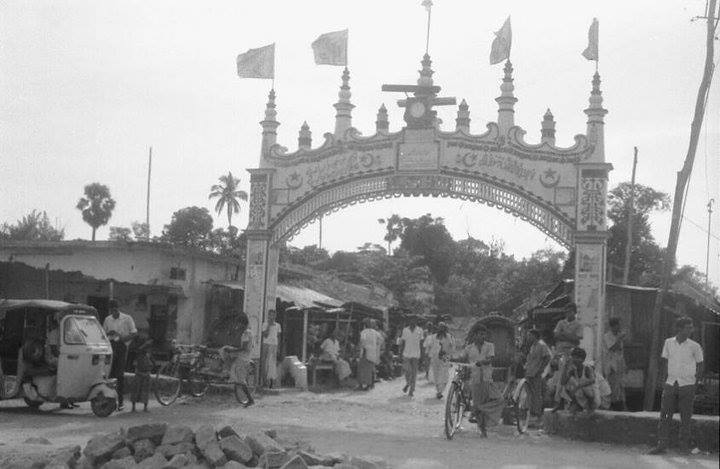
1960 image of the shrine entrance

The tomb and the sarcophagus it houses were originally discovered in 1831, and at the time were enclosed by a wall with protective pillars, that have since been replaced by a more modern structure. At the foot of the tomb hill, there is an ancient three-domed mosque, which is believed to date from the time of the Mughal emperor, Aurangzeb (1618–1707). The interior of the mosque is sparsely decorated, while the mihrab on the qibla wall (indicating the direction of Mecca) has an identical projection on its opposite side.

== Myths and mysteries ==
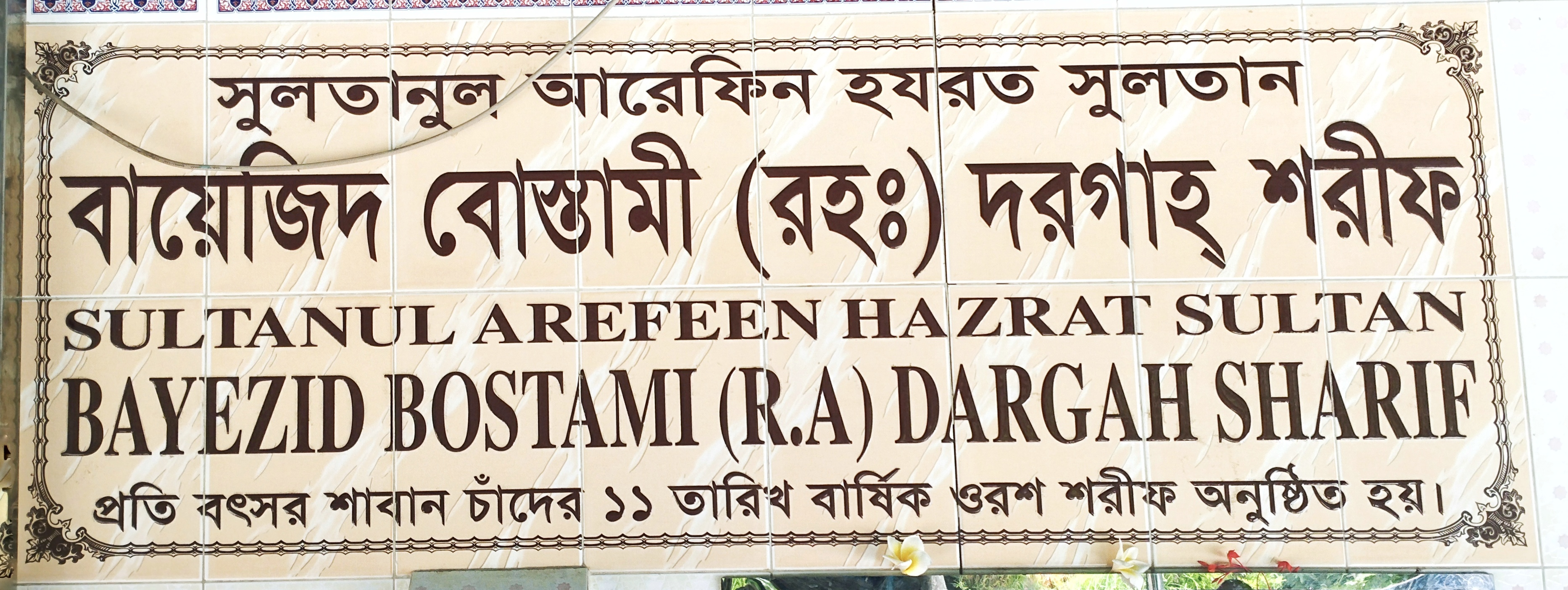
Signboard at Shrine of Bayazid Bostami

Although the shrine is believed to be Bostami's tomb according to local tradition, there is no significant historical evidence about Bostami's visit to this part of Bangladesh. It is thought that this tomb was attributed to him as a jawab or imitation. According to Hamidullah Khan (a historian of 19th-century Chittagong), Muslim faqirs and wanderers of the time used to come to Chittagong to take their seats on hill tops surrounded by jungles.

Some people believe that Bostami visited this part of the world during his lifetime. According to legend, during his return local followers asked him to stay in Chittagong. Overwhelmed by their love and devotion, Bostami pierced his fifth (little) finger, allowed a few drops of blood to fall to the ground, and permitted his followers to build a shrine there on his name.

Although there is no authentic historical record about Bostami's visit to Chittagong, some 18th-century Bengali poets remembered a Shah Sultan of Nasirabad in their poems.

== Bostami turtle (mazari) ==
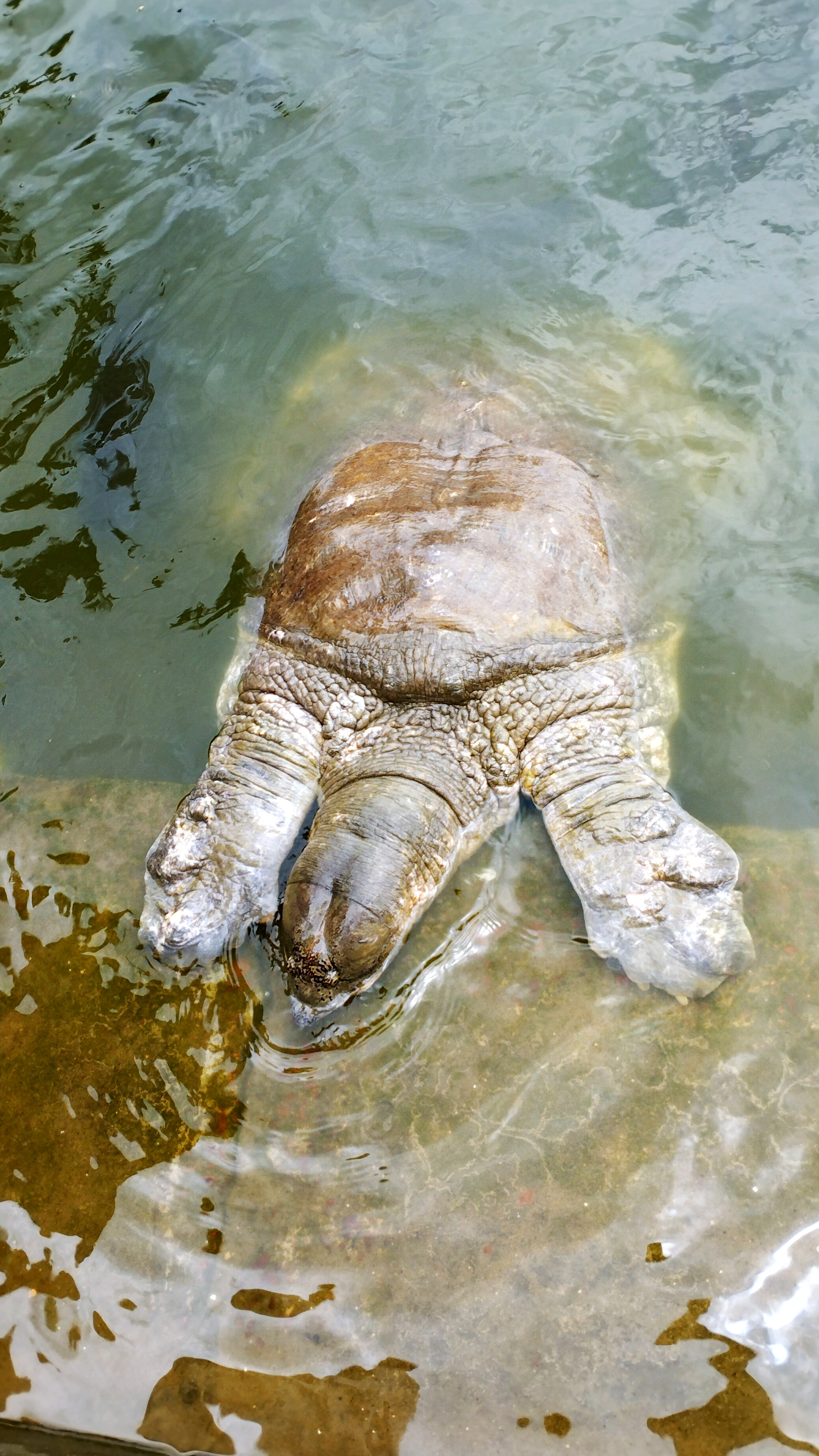
Black soft-shell turtles known as Bostami turtles

In front of the tomb, there is a large pond that houses a large number of black soft-shelled turtles known as Bostami turtle or Bostami kachim (locally called mazari) which are a very rare and critically endangered species. Legends claim that these turtles are the descendants of evil spirits that incurred the wrath of the renowned saint, Bayazid Bostami, while he was visiting the area. It is believed that the evil spirits were then transformed into turtles as a punishment and are doomed to spend eternity in this pool. At present, the shrine's caretakers – the Mazar Committee – protect the turtle population but will not allow specimens to be taken anymore, regardless of whether they would be killed or reintroduced into the wild.

Scientifically, the black soft-shelled turtle or Bostami turtle (Aspideretes nigricans, sometimes placed in genus Nilssonia) is a species of freshwater turtle found in India (Assam and Tripura) and Bangladesh (Chittagong). They have been long-believed to be inbred variants of the Ganges soft-shelled turtle (A. gangeticus or N. gangeticus) or the peacock soft-shelled turtle (A. hurum or N. hurum). While it is a close relative of the latter, it is a distinct species. As of 2002, the IUCN classified the species as extinct in the wild.

== High court rule ==
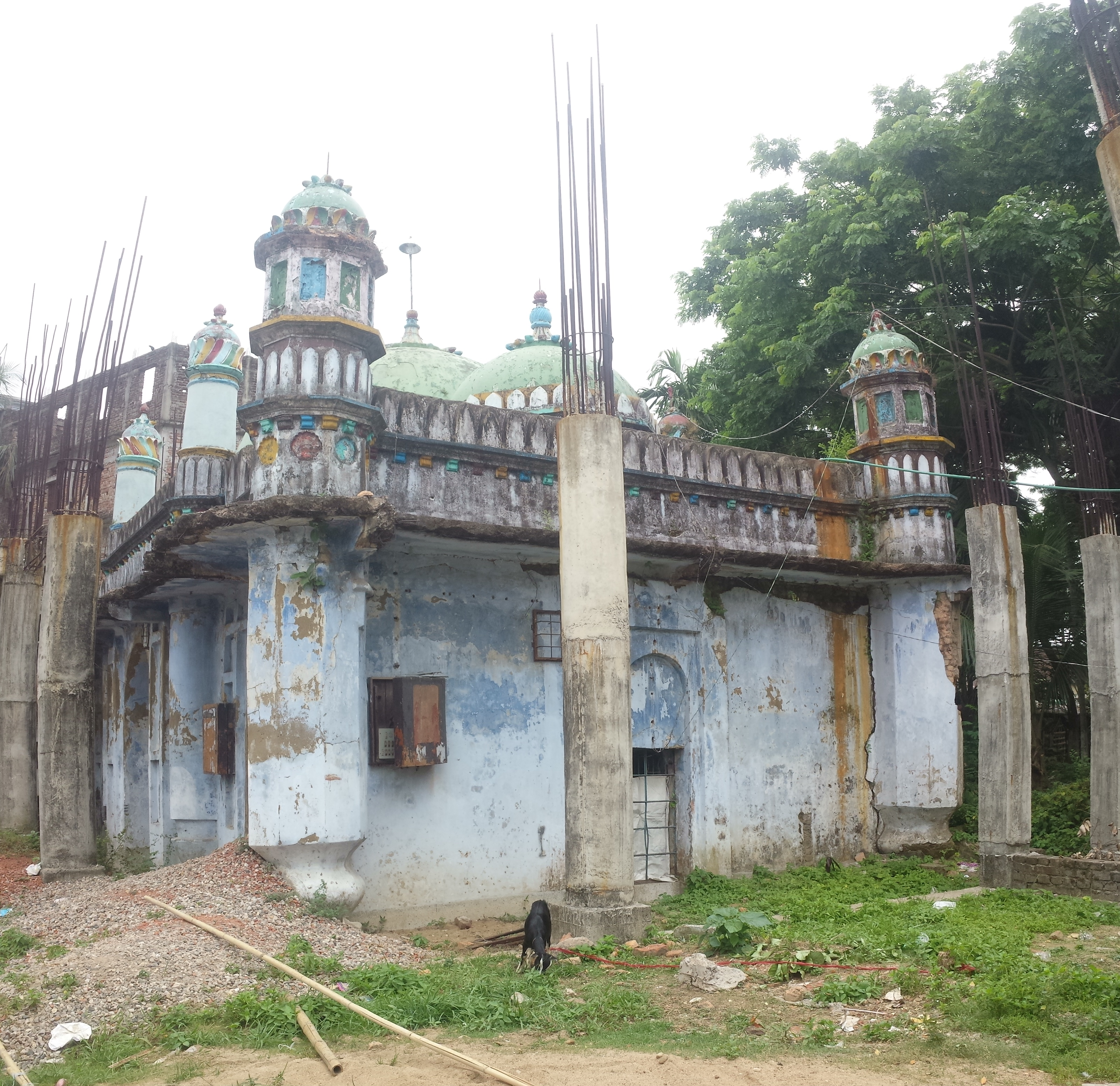
New erected pillars near the old shrine building

2012 an initiative taken to build a multi-storey mosque at the location of the pond was stayed by the Supreme Court of Bangladesh. Although several concrete pillars had been erected inside the shrine pond, about 10 feet off the bank despite the rule of high court.
