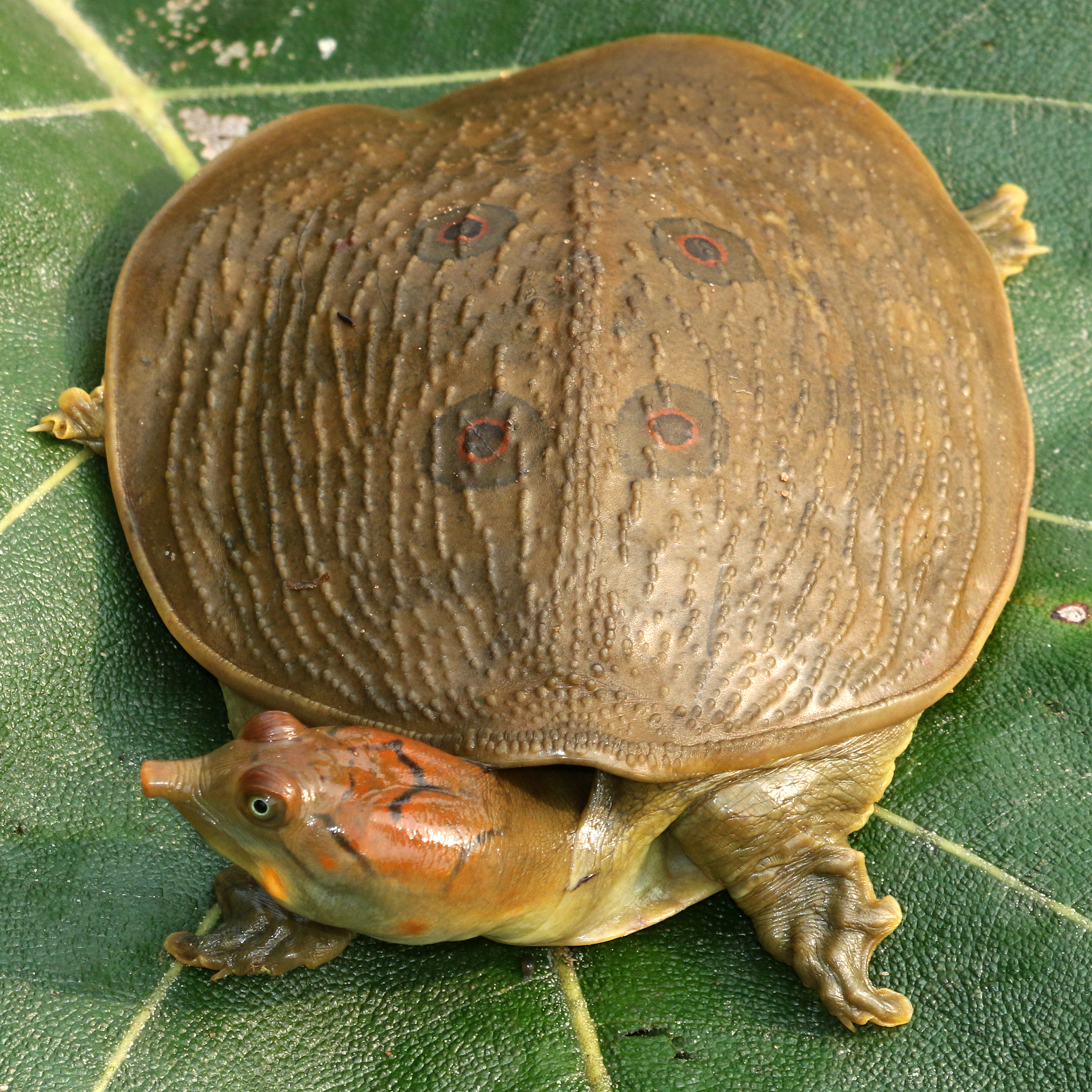

Conservation status
- Critically Endangered (IUCN 3.1)
- CITES Appendix I

Scientific classification
- Kingdom: Animalia
- Phylum: Chordata
- Class: Reptilia
- Order: Testudines
- Suborder: Cryptodira
- Family: Trionychidae
- Genus: Nilssonia
- Species: N. leithii

Binomial name
- Nilssonia leithii (Gray, 1872)

Synonyms
- Trionyx javanicus — Gray, 1831 (part); Testudo gotaghol Buchanan-Hamilton, 1831 (nomen nudum); Aspilus gataghol — Gray, 1872; Trionyx leithii Gray, 1872; Isola leithii — Gray, 1873; Aspideretes leithii — O.P. Hay, 1904; Trionyx sulcifrons Annandale, 1915; Trionyx leithi M.A. Smith, 1931 (ex errore); Amyda leithi — Mertens, L. Müller & Rust, 1934; Aspideretes leithi — Choudhury & Bhupathy, 1993; Trionys leithii — Obst, 1996; Trionix leithi — Richard, 1999

= Leith's softshell turtle =

Species of reptile

Leith's softshell turtle (Nilssonia leithii) is a species of turtle in the family Trionychidae. The species is found in peninsular Indian rivers including the Thungabhadra, Ghataprabha, Bhavani, Godavari, Kaveri and Moyar Rivers. The type locality is Pune in India.

== Etymology ==
The specific name, leithii, is in honor of Andrew H. Leith, a physician with the Bombay Sanitary Commission.

== Description ==
N. leithii is intermediate between N. gangetica and N. hurum. It is like the former in the width of the interorbital space, the comparatively short mandibular symphysis, and the markings of the head. It is like the latter in the longer and more pointed snout, the absence of a strong ridge on the inner alveolar surface of the mandible, and in the presence, in the young, of four or more dorsal ocelli, which are, however, smaller than in N. hurum.

Adults may attain a straight carapace length of 64 cm (25 in).

== Diet ==
N. leithii preys on mosquito larvae, crabs, freshwater molluscs, and fish. It also sometimes feeds on small aquatic vegetation.

== Reproduction ==
The adult female N. leithii lays eggs in June. The eggs are spherical, and the diameter of each egg is 30 to 31 mm (1.2 in).

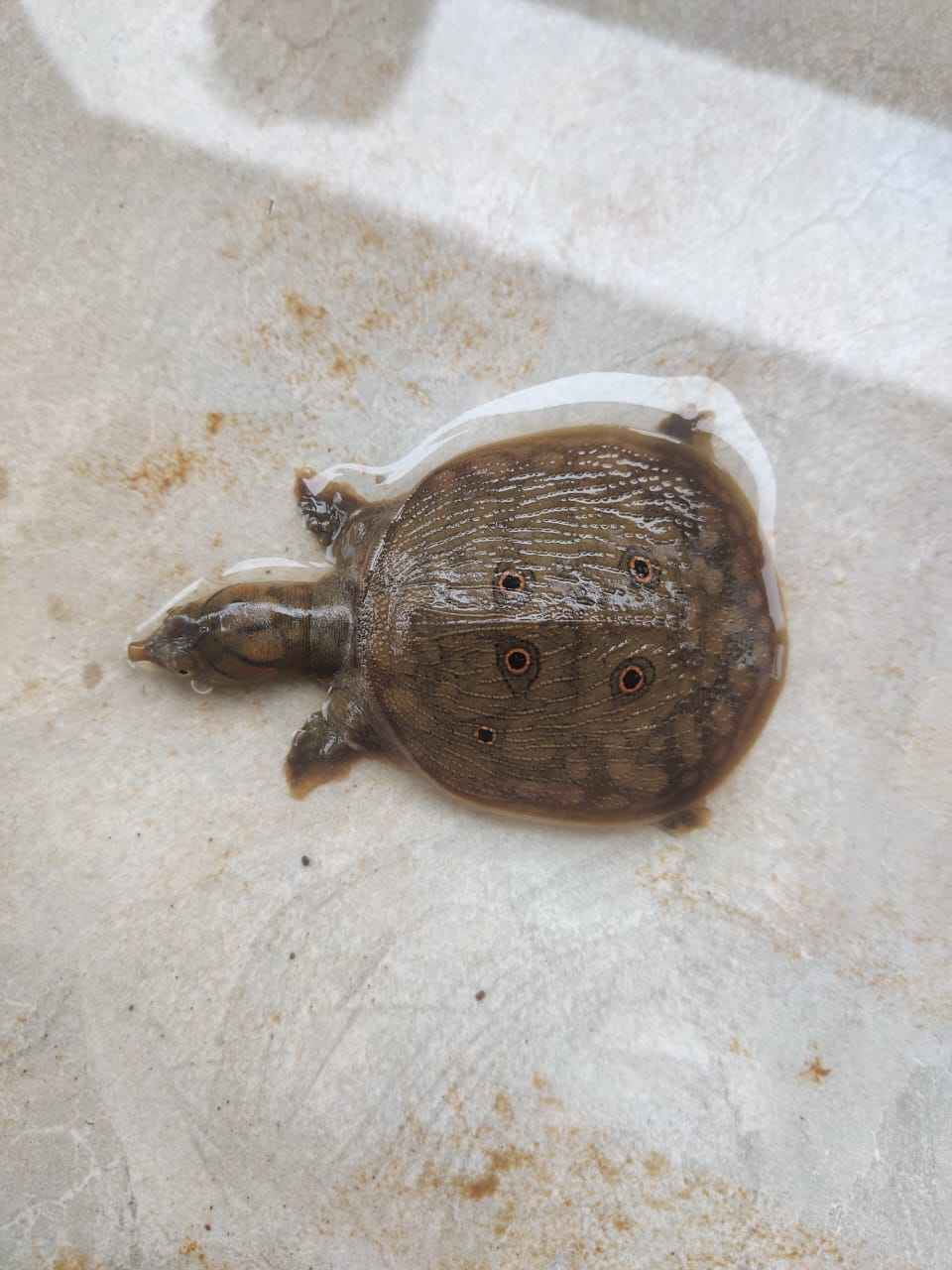
Leith's softshell turtle (Nilssonia leithii) hatchling found in Bhor, Maharashtra

== Threats ==
The species N. leithii is locally exploited throughout peninsular India. Other major threats are riverine development projects, aquatic pollution, sand mining, construction of hydroelectric projects, poaching, and exploitation of eggs.

== Geographic range ==
Leith's softshell turtle is endemic to peninsular India in the Indian states of Andhra Pradesh, Karnataka, Kerala, Madhya Pradesh, Maharashtra, Tamil Nadu and Odisha
