= Baneswar Shiva Temple =

Hindu temple in West Bengal, India

- বাণেশ্বর মন্দির bāṇeśśor mondir
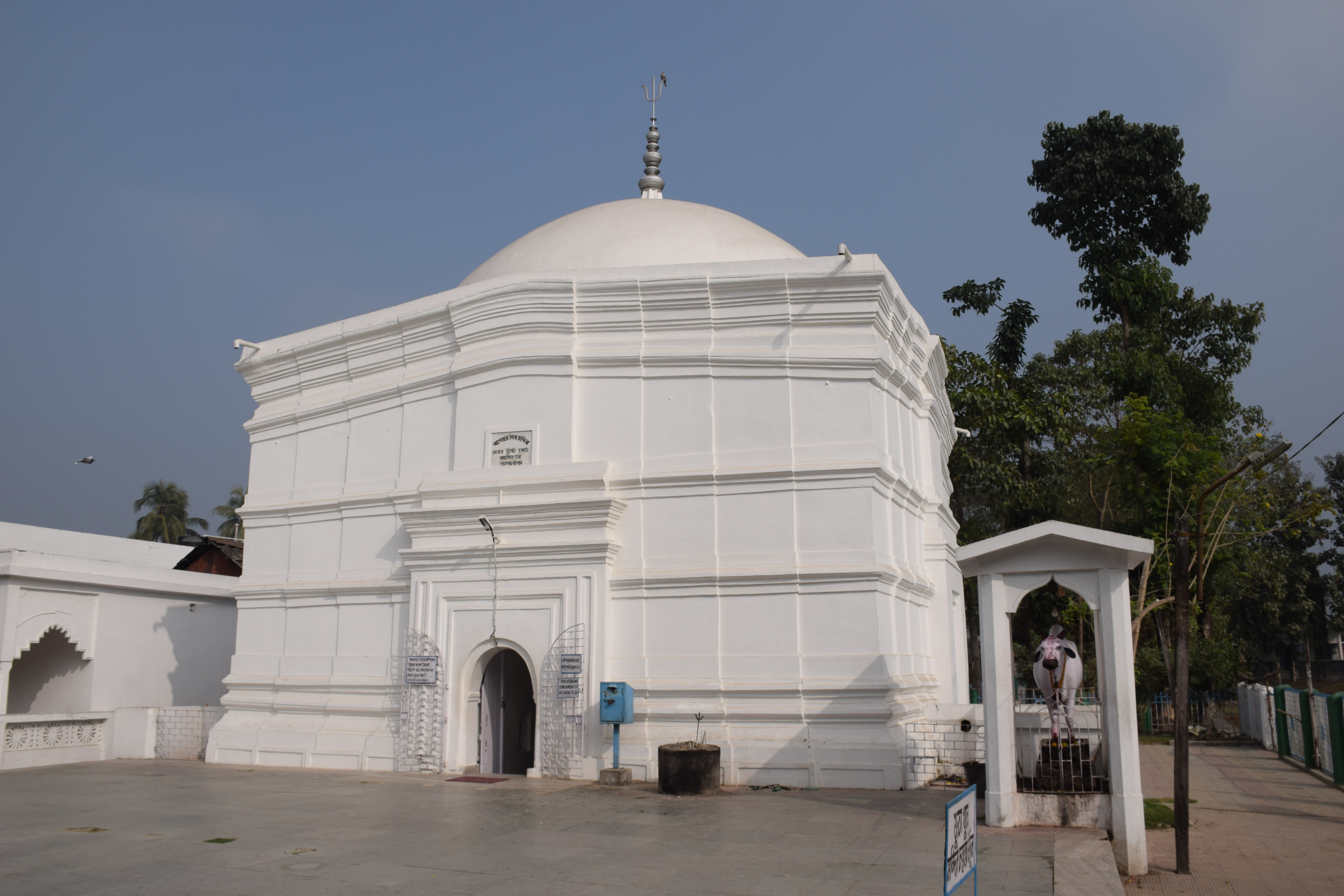
- Baneswar Temple

- Location within West Bengal Location within India

Religion
- Affiliation: Hinduism
- Festival: Maha Shivaratri

Location
- Location: Baneswar
- State: West Bengal
- Country: India
- Interactive map of Baneswar Shiva Temple
- Coordinates: 26.399063°N 89.497535°E

Baneswar Shiva temple is a Hindu temple dedicated to Shiva located at Baneswar in the Cooch Behar II CD block in the Cooch Behar Sadar subdivision of the Cooch Behar district in West Bengal, India. Here, Shiva is worshipped in the form of Baneswar.

== Geography ==
Places in the Cooch Behar Sadar subdivision in Cooch Behar district
CT: census town, M: municipal town, R: rural/ urban centre, H: historical/ religious centre
Owing to space constraints in the small map, the actual locations in a larger map may vary slightly

=== Location ===
Baneswar Shiva temple is located at 26.399063°N 89.497535°E.

It is about 10 kilometres (6.2 mi) from Cooch Behar and is located near Baneswar railway station on the Alipurduar-Bamanhat branch line. It is 1.6 kilometres (0.99 mi) from New Baneswar railway station on the New Jalpaiguri–New Bongaigaon section of the Barauni–Guwahati line.

Note: The map alongside presents some of the notable locations in the subdivision. All places marked in the map are linked in the larger full screen map.

== The temple ==
The beginning of Baneswar Shiva temple is mired in mythology. According to popular belief the legendary Raja Banasura, an ardent devotee of Shiva had made the latter agree to come down to earth. When Shiva was following Raja Banasura, the latter suddenly stopped at Baneswar (earlier name Gordasandara), which was a breach of agreement. Shiva instantly disappeared and later established a Shiva-linga on the banks of the Bangti River. Many believe that the place was named after the Raja. However, there is no mention of the temple in the legend.

According to some, the temple was built by Raja Jalpeswar, who built the Jalpesh temple. He is believed to have ruled in the second or third century and is mentioned in ‘Jalpesh Mahatya’. Some others think that Raja Nilambar of the Khen dynasty had built it. Yet others think that Maharaja Nara Narayan of the Koch dynasty established it and Maharaja Pran Narayan of the Cooch Behar State subsequently revamped it.

The present structure is squarish with a dome and a slightly curved cornish. It has two entrances -one on the west and the other in the east. The temple has a Shiva linga and a ‘Gouripat’ in the garbhagriha, 3.1 metres (10 ft) below the plinth level. The temple was slightly tilted on the east during an earth-quake in 1897. It has a height of 10.9 metres (36 ft) and the base measures 9.6 metres (31 ft) square. The walls are 2.5 metres (8 ft 2 in) thick. There are some decorated narrow strips on the walls. It has a raised platform in the front. There is a bull made of cement on the right. On the northern side there is a tin shed housing idols of Shiva and ‘ardhanariswar’. There are some other idols also, including a Kali idol in another shed.

There is a big pond nearby 'Shiv pukur' which is a habitat of many Black softshell turtle, a critically endangered species of turtle. The turtles are locally known as 'Mohan' and are sacred.

A week-long fair is held during Shiva Chaturdashi. This temple is under the Cooch Behar Debuttor Sangstha.

Baneswar Shiva temple is a state protected monument.

== Baneswar Shiva temple picture gallery ==
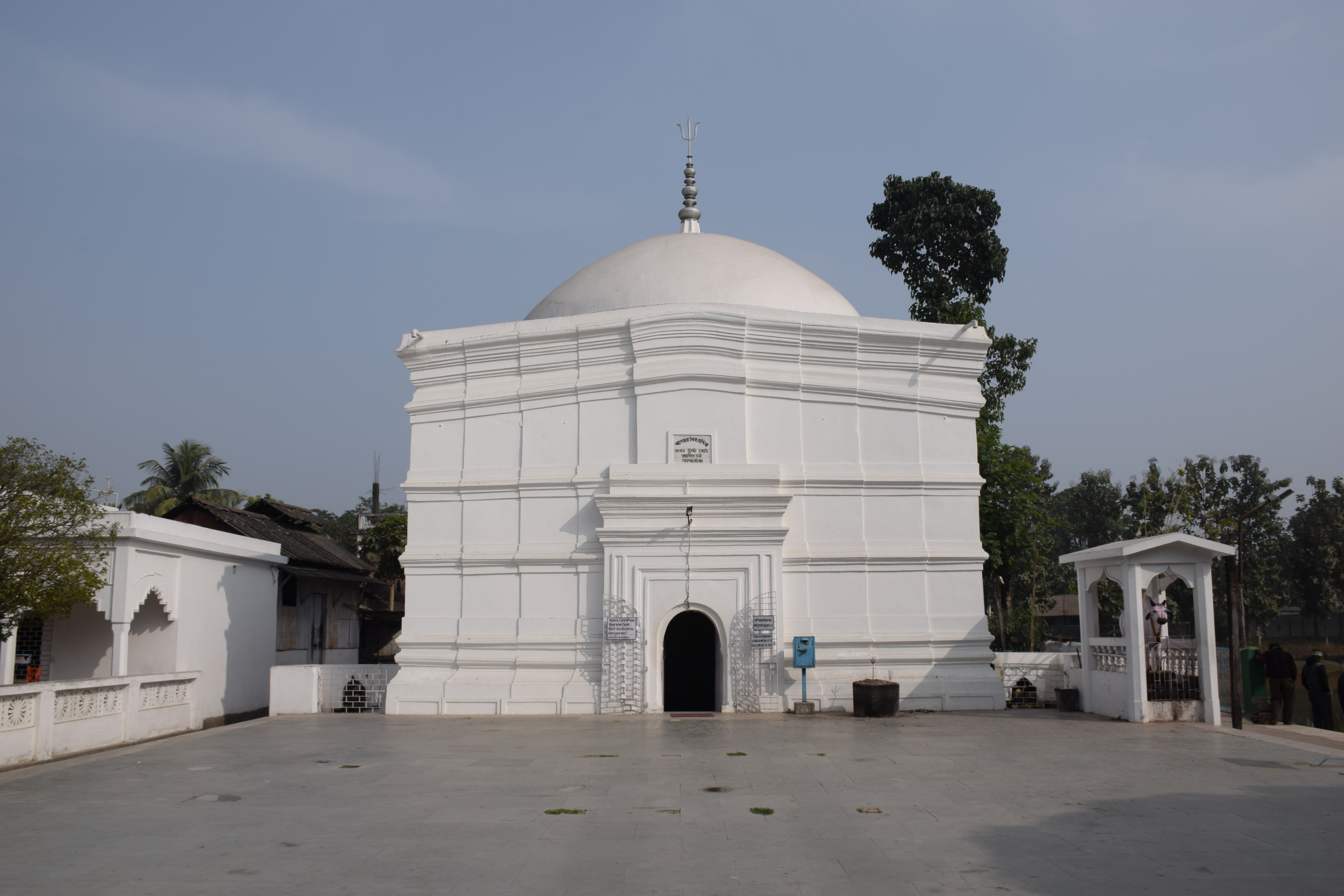

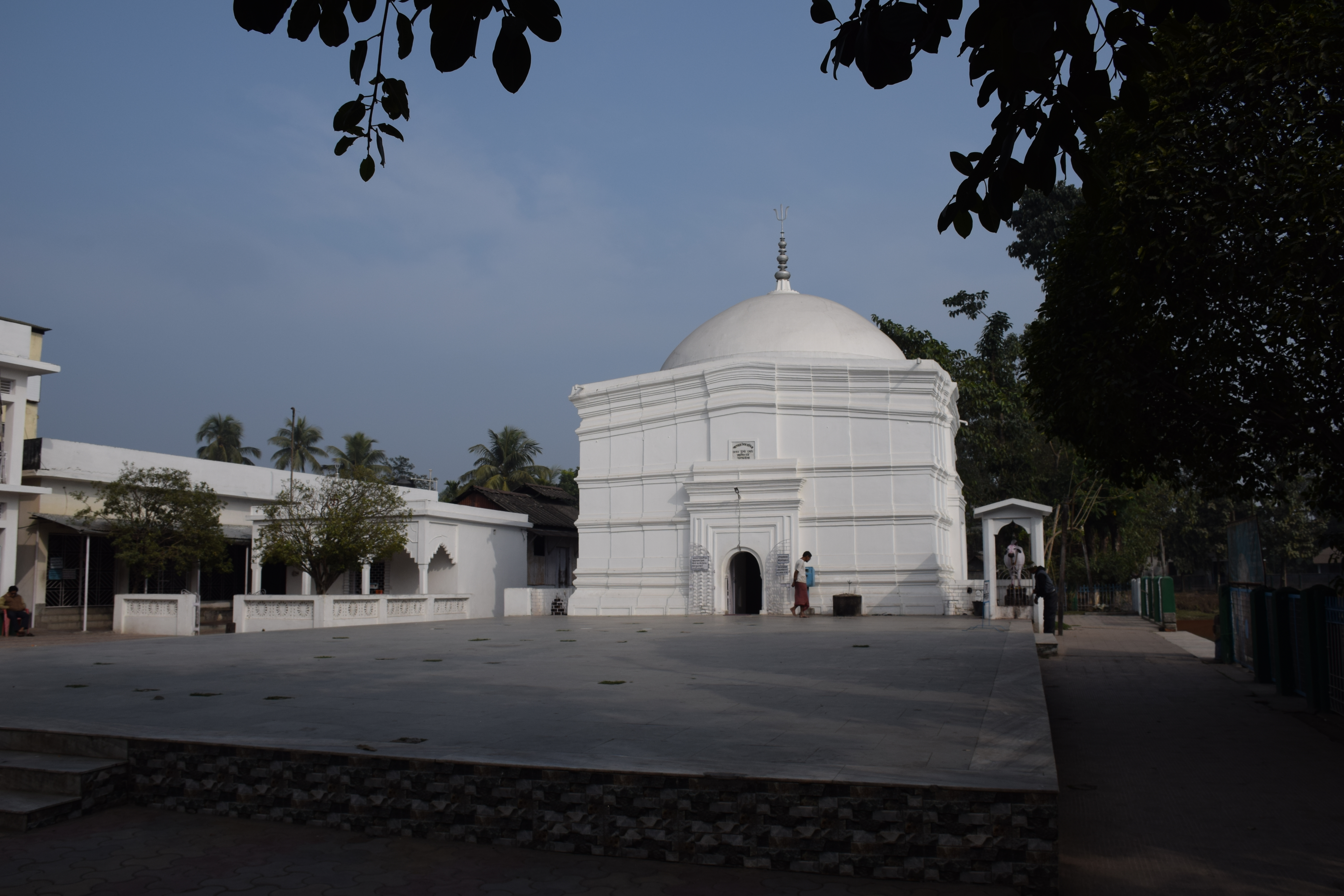

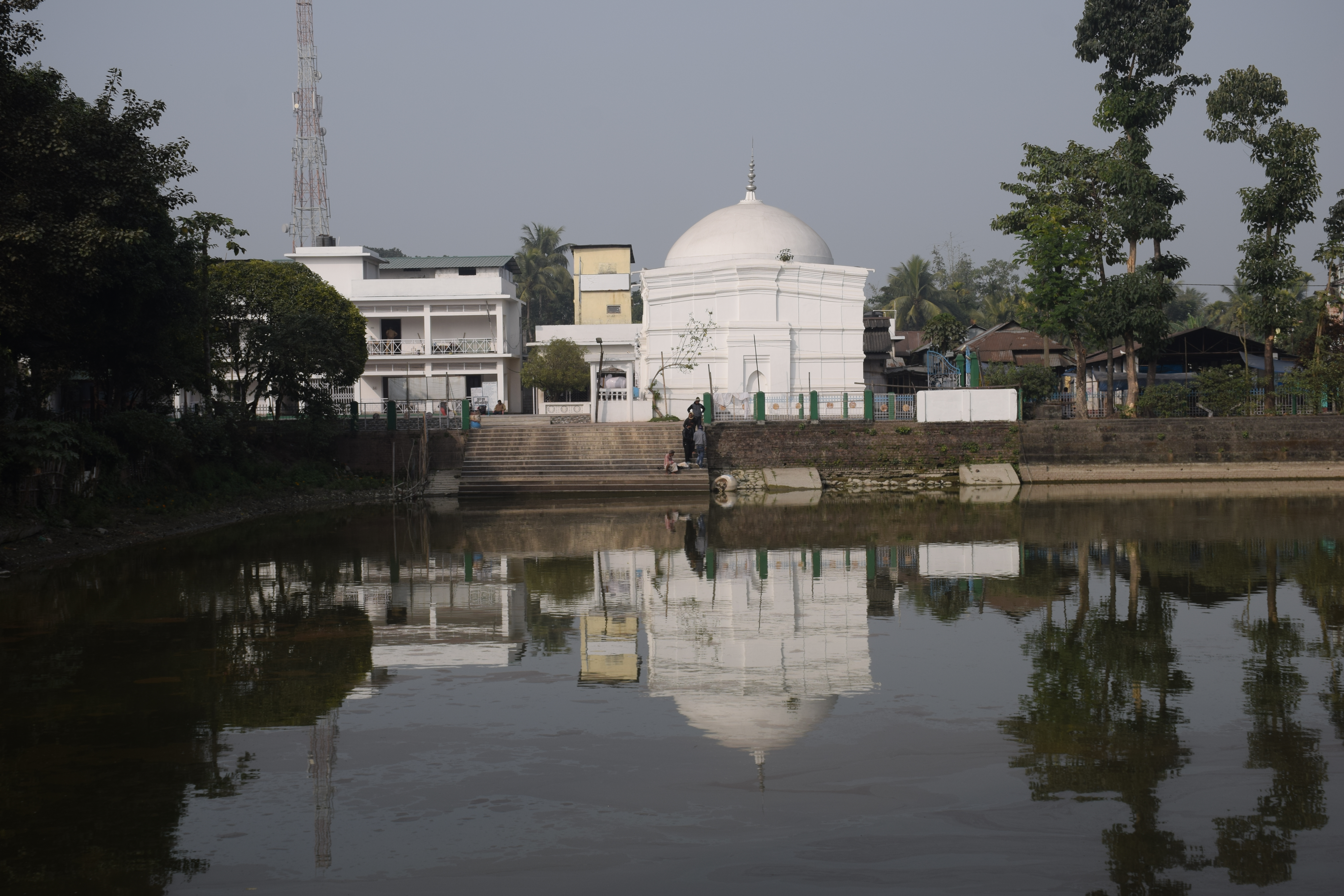
