= New Baneswar railway station =

Railway Station in West Bengal, India

New Baneswar Railway Station

General information
- Location: Station Road, Siddheswari, Baneswar GP, Pin - 736133, Dist - Cooch Behar State: West Bengal; India
- Coordinates: 26.3498°N 89.5107°E
- Elevation: 44 metres (144 ft)
- System: Indian Railways Station
- Owner: Indian Railways
- Operator: Northeast Frontier Railway zone
- Lines: Barauni–Guwahati line, New Jalpaiguri–New Bongaigaon section
- Platforms: 2
- Tracks: 3 (broad gauge)

Construction
- Parking: Available

Other information
- Status: Functioning
- Station code: NBS
- Zone(s): Northeast Frontier Railway zone
- Division(s): Alipurduar
Location
- Location within West Bengal Location within India

"New Baneswar railway station (station code NBS)". is major one among the two railway stations that serves the town of Baneswar, Cooch Behar district in the Indian state of West Bengal. The other smaller station is "Baneswar (station code BSW)". New Baneswar is 11 kms away from the city of Alipurduar and 08 kms away from Cooch Behar. The station lies on the New Jalpaiguri–New Bongaigaon section of Barauni–Guwahati line of Northeast Frontier Railway. This station falls under Alipurduar railway division.
