= Baneswar =

- Census Town
- Location in West Bengal, India
- Coordinates: 26.394363°N 89.495835°E
- Country: India
- State: West Bengal

Area
  - Total: 2.3838 km^{2} (0.9204 sq mi)

Population (2011)
  - Total: 4,841
  - Density: 2,031/km^{2} (5,260/sq mi)

Languages
  - Official: Bengali, English, Rajbangshi
- Time zone: UTC+5:30 (IST)
- PIN: 736133
- Telephone/STD code: 03582
- Website: coochbehar.gov.in

Baneswar is a census town in the Cooch Behar II CD block in the Cooch Behar Sadar subdivision of the Cooch Behar district in West Bengal, India.

== Etymology ==
The word 'Baneswar' is a Sanskritic formation of the words bāna and īshvara. In Hindu mythology, Bana was an asura king. He carried out a Shiva linga, hoping to bring the god Shiva to Patala but failed. Said Shiva linga is now fixed at the Baneshwar temple, according to the legend.

== Geography ==
Places in the Cooch Behar Sadar subdivision in Cooch Behar district
CT: census town, M: municipal town, R: rural/ urban centre, H: historical/ religious centre
Owing to space constraints in the small map, the actual locations in a larger map may vary slightly

=== Location ===
Baneswar is located at 26.394363°N 89.495835°E.

=== Area overview ===
The map alongside shows the north-central part of the district. It has the highest level of urbanisation in an overwhelming rural district. 22.08% of the population of the Cooch Behar Sadar subdivision lives in the urban areas and 77.92% in the rural areas. The entire district forms the flat alluvial flood plains of mighty rivers.

Note: The map alongside presents some of the notable locations in the subdivision. All places marked in the map are linked in the larger full screen map.

== Demographics ==
As per the 2011 Census of India, Baneswar had a total population of 4,841. There were 2,534 (52%) males and 2,307 (48%) females. There were 448 persons in the age range of 0 to 6 years. The total number of literate people in Baneswar was 4,108 (93.51% of the population over 6 years).

== Infrastructure ==
According to the District Census Handbook 2011, Koch Bihar, Baneswar covered an area of 2.3838 km^{2}. Among the civic amenities, it had 1 km roads with open drains, the protected water supply involved tan/pond/lake. It had 600 electric connections. Among the medical facilities it had 1 dispensary/ health centre, 1 veterinary hospital, 15 medicine shop. Among the educational facilities it had 2 primary schools, 4 middle schools, 1 secondary school, 1 senior secondary school. It had 1 recognised short-hand, typewriting and vocational training institution. Among the social, cultural and recreational facilities it had 1 public library and 1 reading room. It had the branch offices of 1 nationalised bank, 1 agricultural credit society.

== Transport ==
Baneswar is well connected with the district town Cooch Behar (12 km) and district Alipurduar (13 km). There are two stations named "Baneswar". and New Baneswar, New Baneswar is located beside Shiva temple through which local train for coochbehar and Siliguri are available.

== Education ==
Baneswar Sarathibala Mahavidyalaya was established in 2009. Affiliated with the Cooch Behar Panchanan Barma University, it offers honours courses in Bengali, English, Sanskrit, history and education, and a general course in arts.

There is a boys' school, Baneswar Khabsa High School, and a girls' school, Baneswar Girls High School. Both are run by the state government. Sarathibala college is located in this village.

== Culture ==
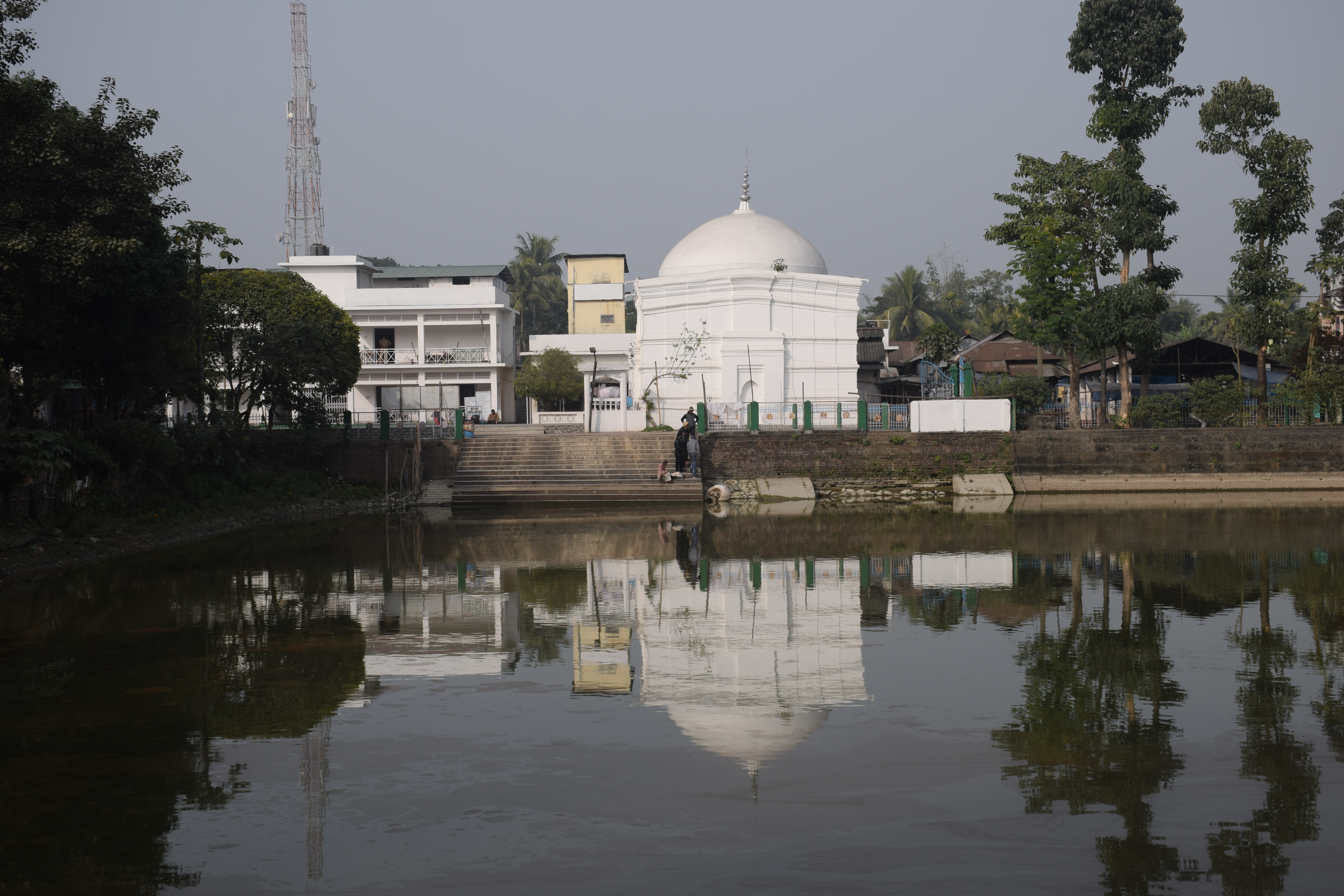
The Shiva temple and the Shiva pukur

The place is known for the Baneswar Shiva temple, and for its tortoises (locally known as 'Mohan') which live in 'Shiva pukur' near the temple.
