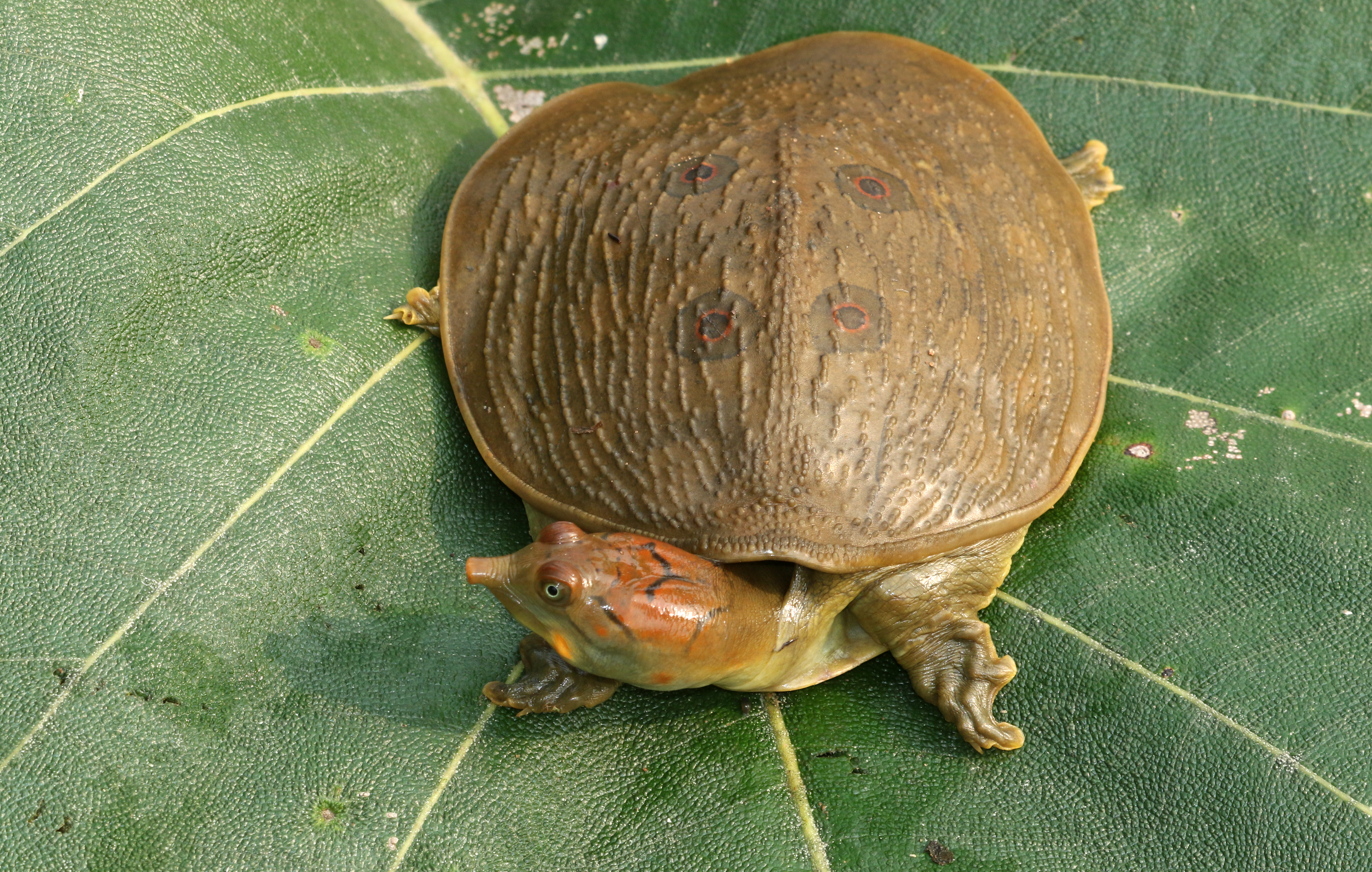
- Nilssonia leithii

Scientific classification
- Kingdom: Animalia
- Phylum: Chordata
- Class: Reptilia
- Order: Testudines
- Suborder: Cryptodira
- Family: Trionychidae
- Subfamily: Trionychinae
- Genus: Nilssonia; Gray, 1872

Species
- See text

Synonyms
- Nilssonia Gray, 1872: 332; Isola Gray, 1873: 51; Aspideretes O.P. Hay, 1904: 274

= Nilssonia (turtle) =

Genus of turtles

Nilssonia is a genus of softshell turtles (family Trionychidae) from rivers, streams, ponds, and lakes in South Asia and Burma. In many treatments, it is monotypic, with the single species Burmese peacock softshell (N. formosa). However, the supposed other genus of peacock softshells, Aspideretes, is more closely related to N. formosa than had been believed. They differ only in the neural plates between the first pleural scale pair of the bony carapace, which are fused into one in N. formosa and unfused in the others.

Thus, it has been proposed to unite the two genera under the older name, Nilssonia. As it seems, the closest living relatives of the Burmese peacock softshell are the Indian softshell turtle (A./N. gangeticus) and the Leith's softshell turtle (A./N. leithii), making the merging of the genera well warranted.

== Etymology ==
The generic name, Nilssonia, is in honor of Swedish zoologist Sven Nilsson.

== Species ==
If the genera are united, the five species are:

- Nilssonia formosa (Gray, 1869) – Burmese peacock softshell, Burmese softshell turtle
- Nilssonia gangetica (Cuvier, 1825) – Indian softshell turtle, Ganges softshell turtle
- Nilssonia hurum (Gray, 1831) – Indian peacock softshell turtle
- Nilssonia leithii (Gray, 1872) – Leith's softshell turtle, Nagpur softshell turtle
- Nilssonia nigricans (Anderson, 1875) – black softshell turtle, Bostami turtle
