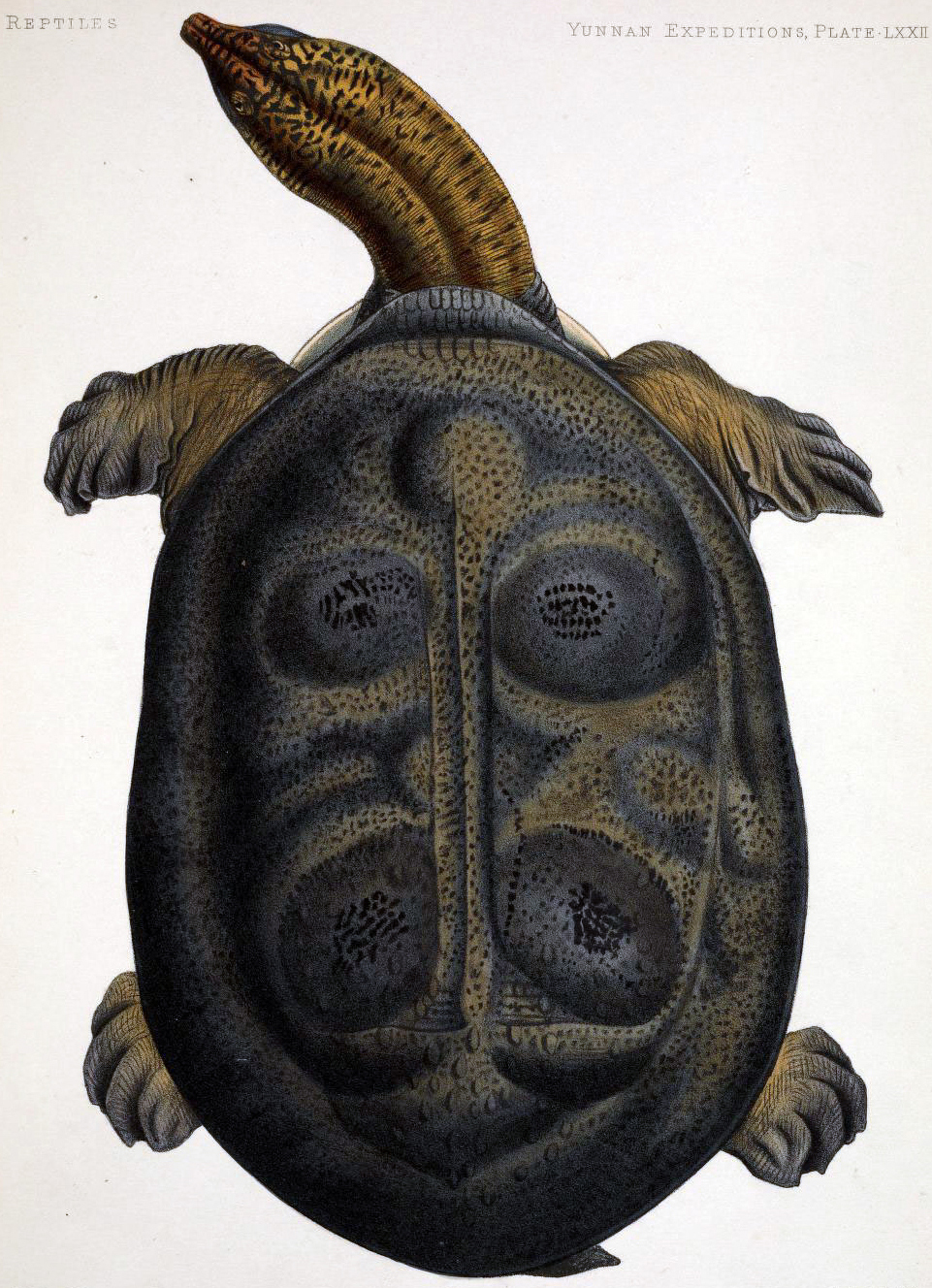
- Illustration by Philibert land Berjeau, 1878
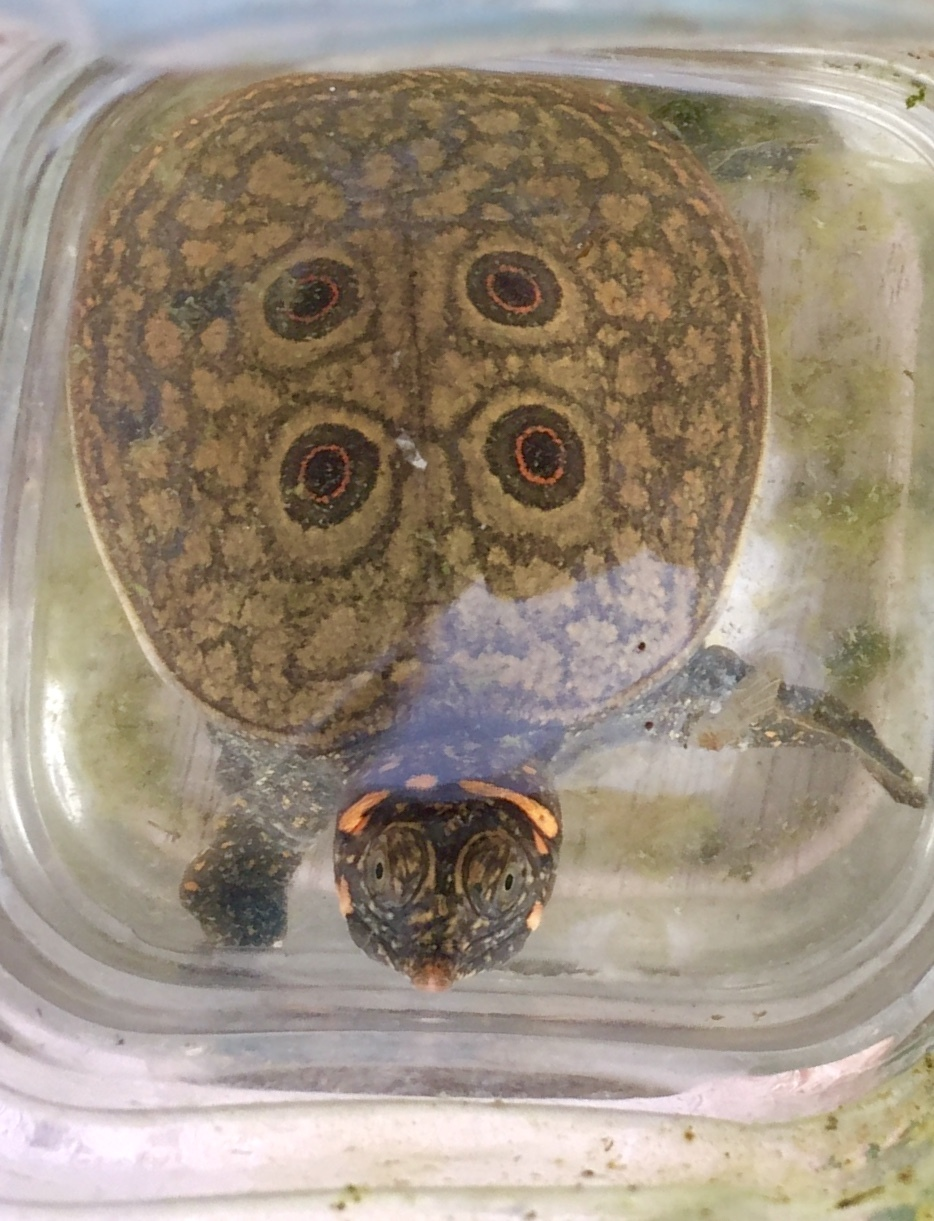
- Juvenile

Conservation status
- Critically Endangered (IUCN 3.1)
- CITES Appendix II

Scientific classification
- Kingdom: Animalia
- Phylum: Chordata
- Class: Reptilia
- Order: Testudines
- Suborder: Cryptodira
- Family: Trionychidae
- Genus: Nilssonia
- Species: N. formosa

Binomial name
- Nilssonia formosa (Gray, 1869)

Synonyms
- Trionyx formosus Gray, 1869; Trionyx peguensis Gray, 1870; Nilssonia formosa Gray, 1872; Isola peguensis Gray, 1873; Trionyx grayii Theobald, 1875; Aspidonectes formosus Baur, 1893; Isola formosa Hay, 1904; Trionyx formosa Gadow, 1923; Amyda formosus Mell, 1929; Trionyx grayi Smith, 1931 (ex errore); Amyda formosa Mertens, Müller & Rust, 1934; Trionyx fomosus Gosławski & Hryniewicz, 1993 (ex errore); Trionyx formosanus Jenkins, 1995 (ex errore); Trionix formosus Richard, 1999

= Burmese peacock softshell =

Species of turtle

The Burmese peacock softshell turtle (Nilssonia formosa) is a species of softshell turtle in the Trionychidae family. It is one of five species in the genus Nilssonia.

== Geographical region ==
The Burmese peacock softshell is found in Myanmar and possibly Thailand. Also reported to be found in Karbi Anglong district of Assam. Nuclear data analyses of a Nilssonia formosa caught near Shuangbai, Yunnan, China by researchers in 2012 suggests the species crossed the watershed between the Salween and Mekong Rivers.
