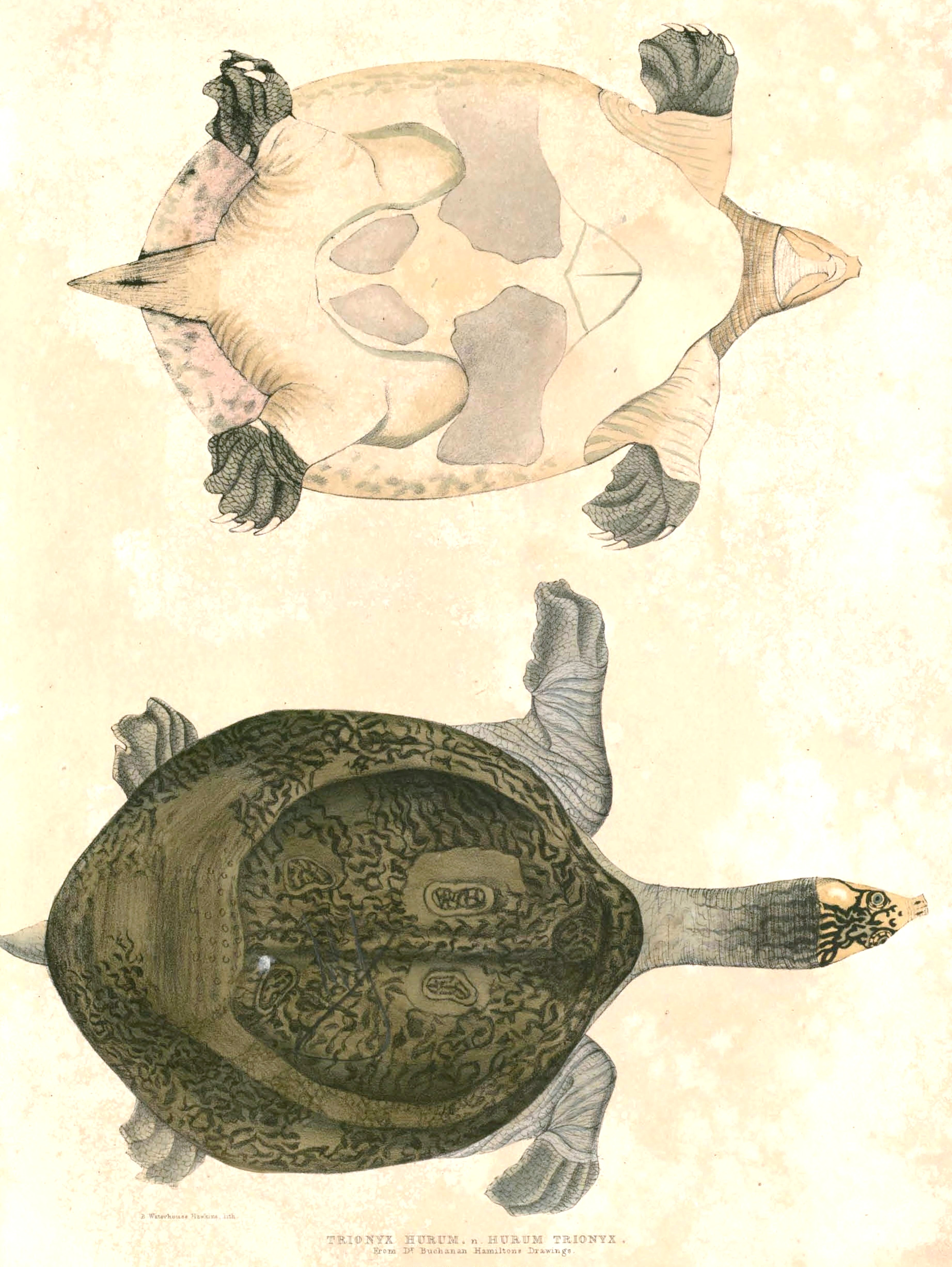

Conservation status
- Endangered (IUCN 3.1)
- CITES Appendix I

Scientific classification
- Kingdom: Animalia
- Phylum: Chordata
- Class: Reptilia
- Order: Testudines
- Suborder: Cryptodira
- Family: Trionychidae
- Genus: Nilssonia
- Species: N. hurum

Binomial name
- Nilssonia hurum (Gray, 1831)

Synonyms
- Trionyx occellatus Gray, 1830; Trionyx hurum Gray, 1831; Gymnopus duvaucelii Duméril & Bibron, 1835; Gymnopus ocellatus Duméril & Bibron, 1835; Trionyx bellii Gray, 1872; Trionyx sewaare Gray, 1872; Trionyx buchanani Theobald, 1874; Isola hurum Baur, 1893; Aspideretes hurum Hay, 1904; Aspidonectes hurum Hay, 1904; Tyrse hurum Hay, 1904; Amyda hurum Barbour, 1912; Gymnopus duvaucelli Smith, 1931; Trionix hurum Richard, 1999; Testudo chim Buchanan-Hamilton, 1831 (nomen nudum)

= Indian peacock softshell turtle =

Species of freshwater turtle

Indian peacock softshell turtle (Nilssonia hurum) is a species of turtle found in South Asia and is listed on the IUCN Red List as an endangered species.

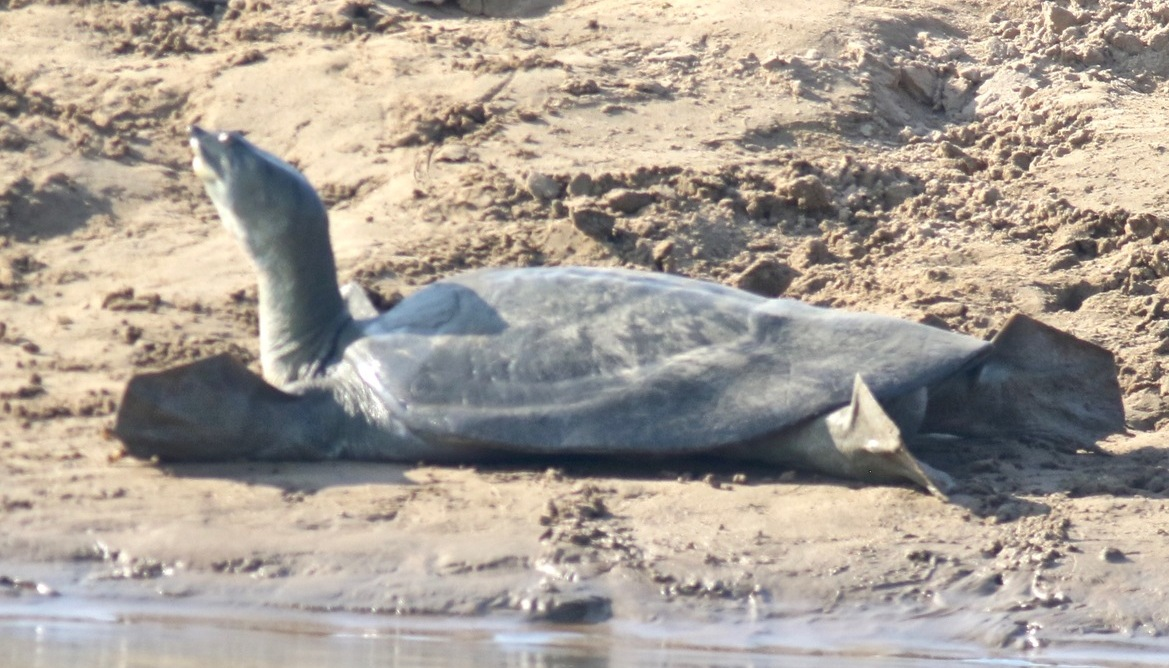
Basking, India

== Geographical range ==
The Indian peacock soft-shell turtle is found in Bangladesh, India (the states of Mizoram, Assam, Bihar, Madhya Pradesh, Odisha, Rajasthan, Uttar Pradesh, West Bengal), Nepal and Pakistan.

Type locality in India: Fatehgarh, Ganges, to Barrackpore (about 23 kilometers north of Calcutta), West Bengal, India".
