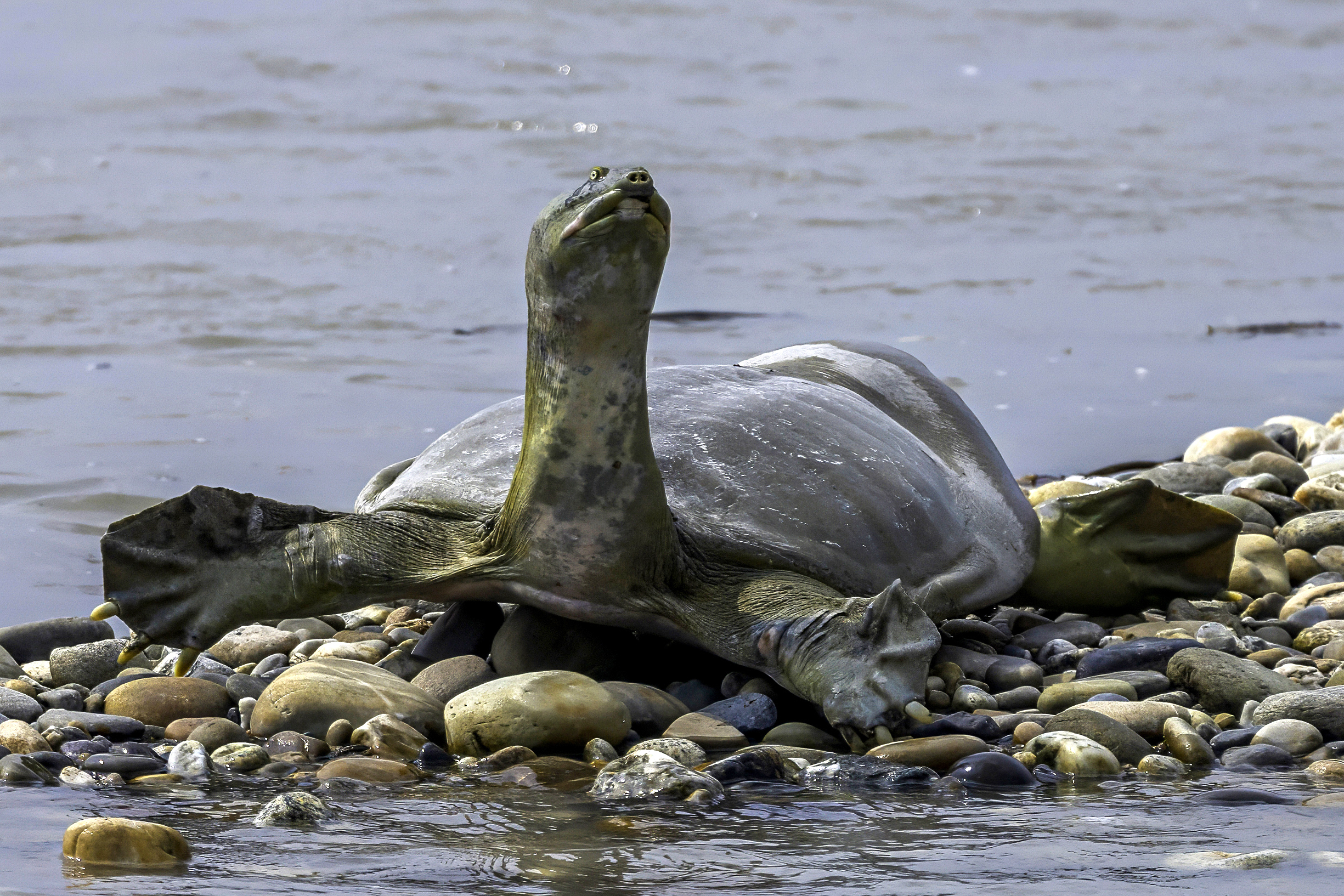
- Chitwan National Park, Nepal
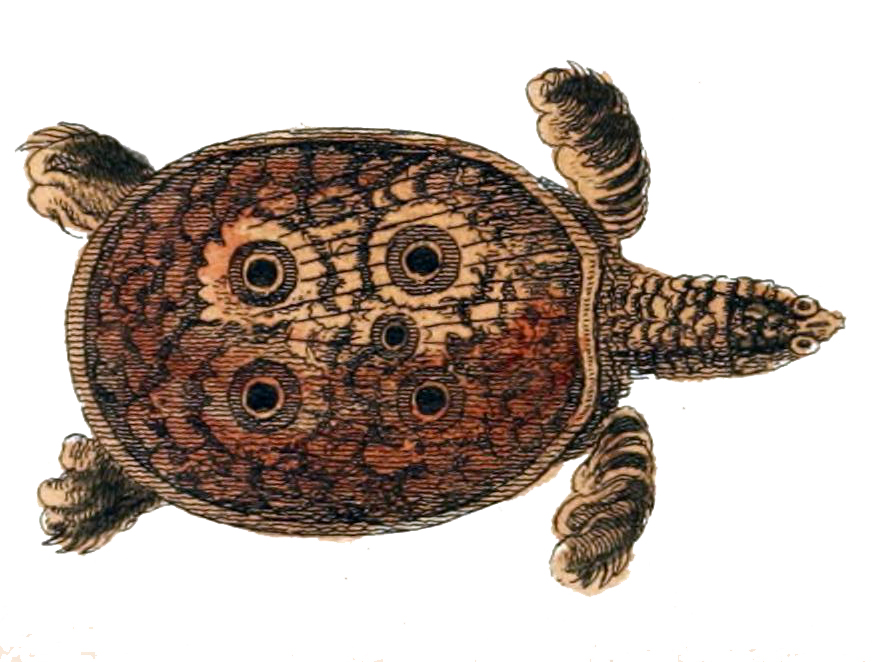
- Immature (the dark eyespots on the carapace are indistinct or absent in adults)

Conservation status
- Endangered (IUCN 3.1)
- CITES Appendix I

Scientific classification
- Kingdom: Animalia
- Phylum: Chordata
- Class: Reptilia
- Order: Testudines
- Suborder: Cryptodira
- Family: Trionychidae
- Genus: Nilssonia
- Species: N. gangetica

Binomial name
- Nilssonia gangetica (Cuvier, 1825)

Synonyms
- Trionyx gangeticus Cuvier, 1825; Trionyx javanicus Gray, 1831; Testudo gotaghol Buchanan-Hamilton, 1831 (nomen nudum); Aspidonectes gangeticus Wagler, 1833; Gymnopus duvaucelii Duméril & Bibron, 1835; Tyrse gangetica Gray, 1844; Trionyx gangetiga Gray, 1873 (ex errore); Isola gangetica Baur, 1893; Aspideretes gangeticus Hay, 1904; Trionyx gangeticus mahanaddicus Annandale, 1912; Gymnopus duvaucelli Smith, 1931; Amyda gangetica Mertens, Müller & Rust, 1934; Trionix gangeticus Richard, 1999

= Indian softshell turtle =

Species of freshwater turtle

The Indian softshell turtle (Nilssonia gangetica), or Ganges softshell turtle, is a species of softshell turtle found in South Asia in rivers such as the Ganges, Indus and Mahanadi. This vulnerable turtle reaches a carapace length of up to 94 cm (37 in). It feeds mostly on fish, amphibians, carrion and other animal matter, but also takes aquatic plants. This turtle is listed in part II of Schedule I of the Wild Life (Protection) Act, 1972 and possession of this species is an offence.

== Description ==
The species is identified on the basis of the structure of the carapace and plastron. There are eight pairs of costal plates, the last well developed and in contact throughout on the median line; two neurals between the first pair of costals; plates coarsely pitted and vermiculate. Epiplastra narrowly separated from each other in front of the ontoplastron, which forms an obtuse or a right angle; plastral callosities very large, hyo-hypoplastral, xiphiplastral, and, in old specimens, ento-plastral. Dorsal skin of young with longitudinal ridges of small tubercles. Head moderate; snout (on the skull) about as long as the diameter of the orbit; interorbital region, in the adult, considerably narrower than the nasal fossa; postorbital arch one third to one half the greatest diameter of the orbit; mandible with the inner edge strongly raised, forming a sharp ridge, which sends off a short perpendicular process at the symphysis; the diameter of the mandible at the symphysis does not exceed the diameter of the orbit. Olive above; back of young vermiculated with fine black lines, but without ocelli; head with a black longitudinal streak from between the eyes to the nape, intersected by two or three inverted-V shaped black streaks; lower parts yellowish. Length of dorsal disk 2 feet.

== Distribution ==
This species is often found to occur in the Indus, Ganges/Padma, Meghna, Brahmaputra, Jamuna, Narmada and Mahanadi basins and most of their tributaries and intervening drainages and in the countries of Afghanistan, Bangladesh, India (Assam, Bihar, Gujarat, Jammu & Kashmir, Madhya Pradesh, Orissa, Punjab, Rajasthan, Uttar Pradesh and West Bengal), Southern Nepal and Pakistan.

== In culture ==
These turtles are often maintained in the temple ponds of Orissa where they are considered sacred.

== Gallery ==
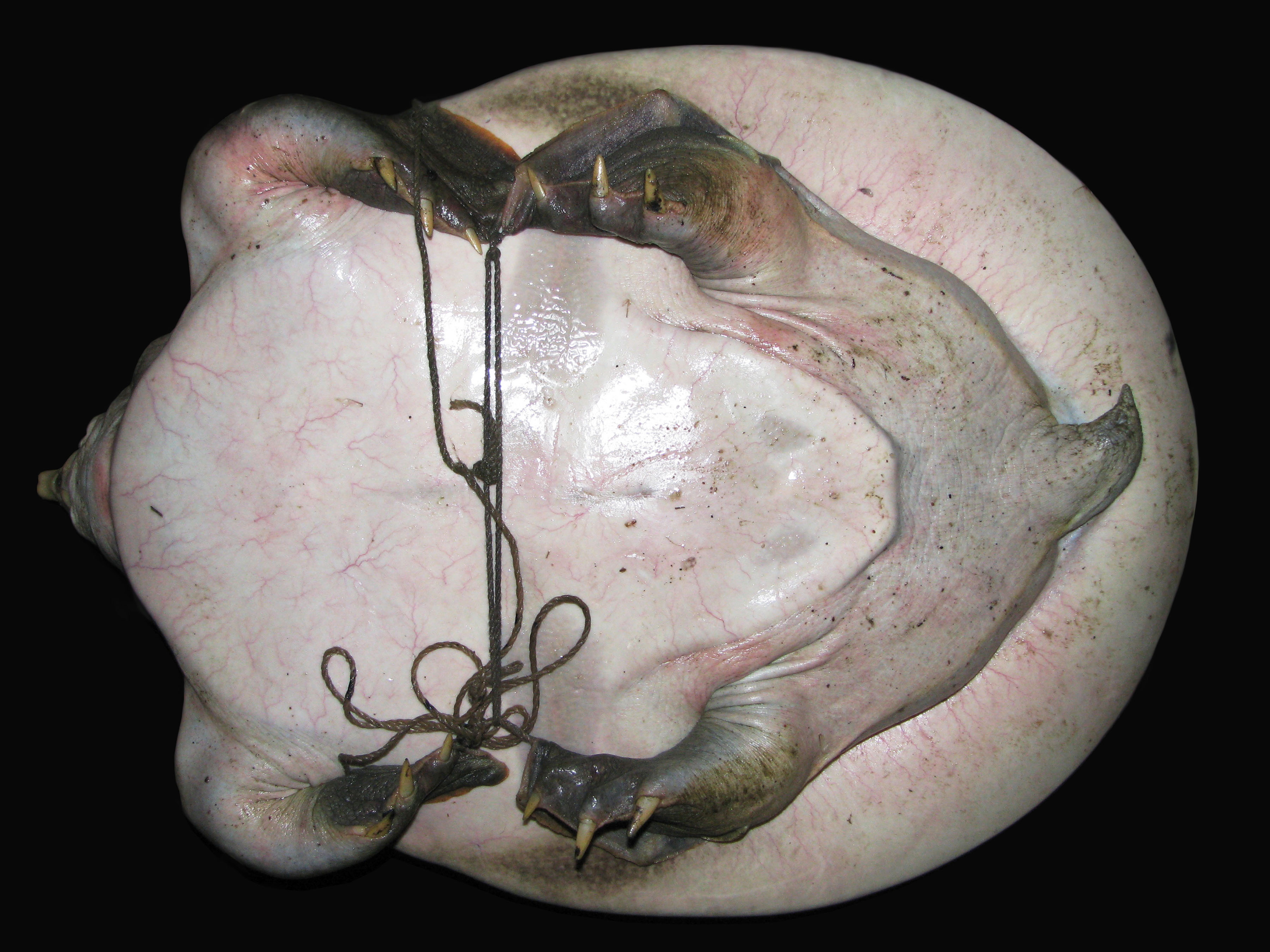
Ventral side of Nilssonia gangetica

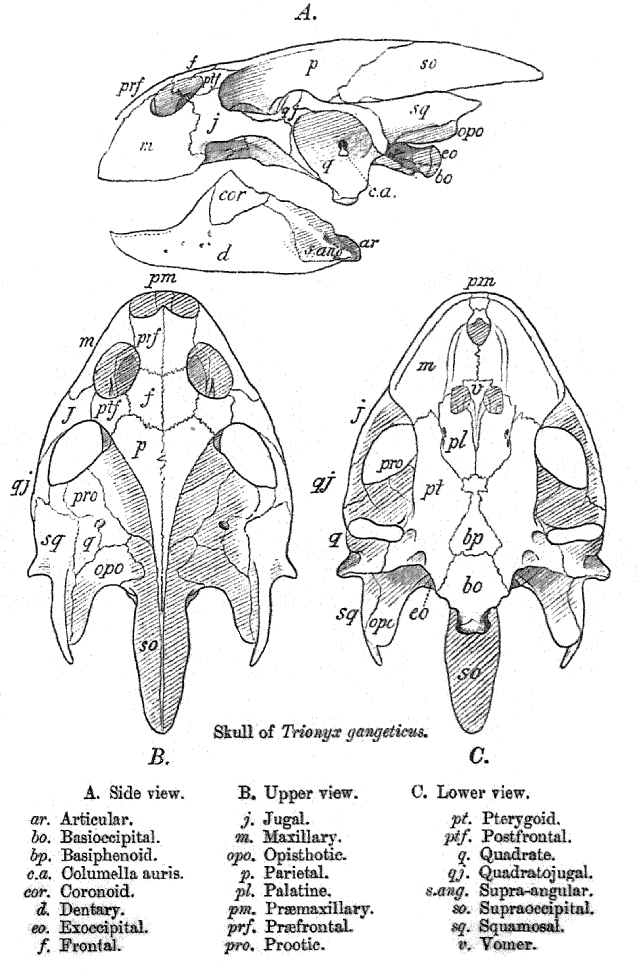
Skull structure of Nilssonia gangetica

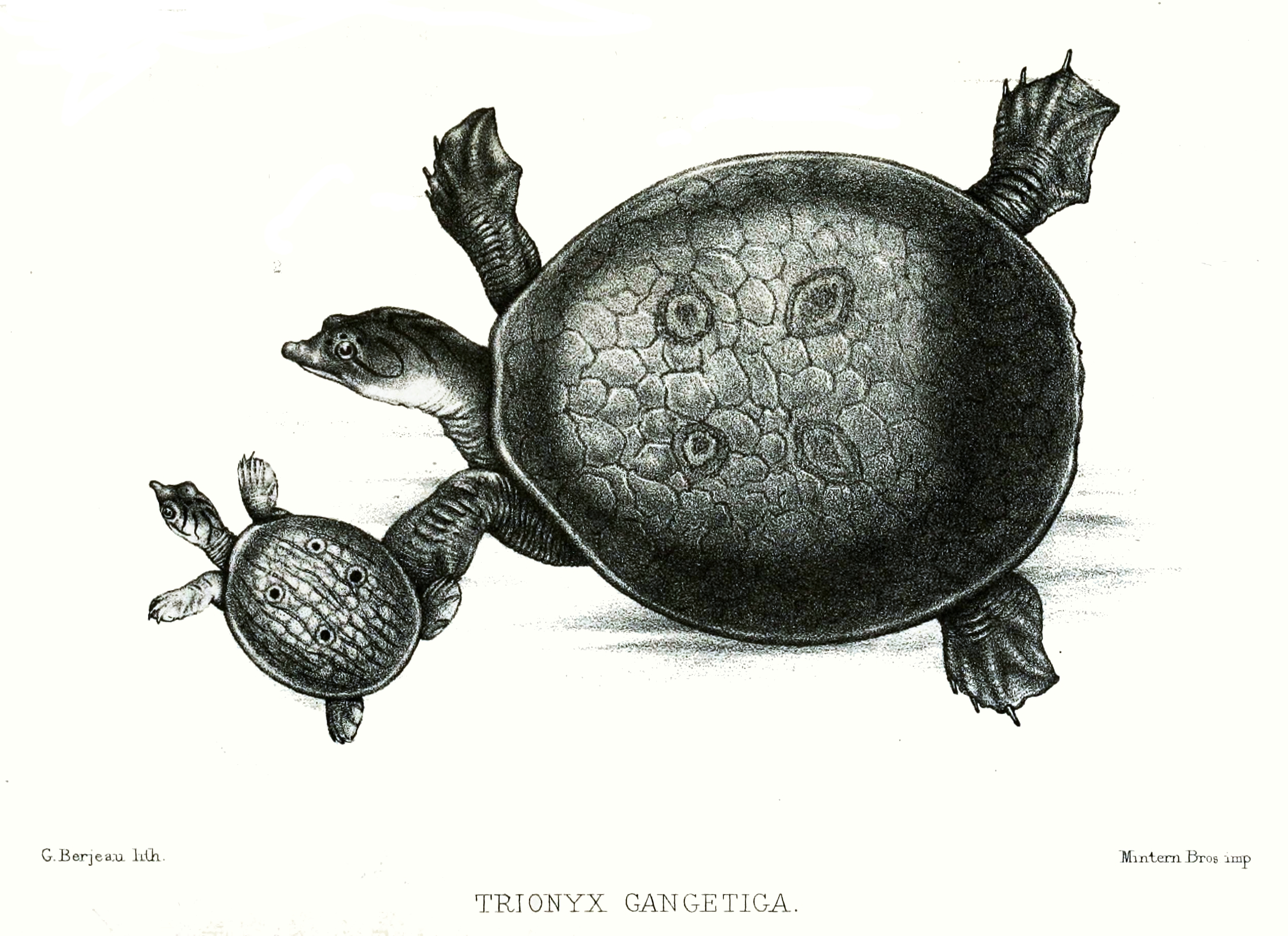

== See also ==
- Indian flapshell turtle
