= List of largest reptiles =

Skeleton of Argentinosaurus, possibly one of the largest reptiles (and animals) to ever exist, with a human for scale.

This list of largest reptiles takes into consideration both body length and mass of large reptile species, including average ranges and maximum records. The crocodilians reach a length of 4 m (13 ft) and a mass of 500 kg (1,100 lb) or more. It is worth mentioning that, unlike the upper weight of mammals, birds or fish, mass in reptiles is frequently poorly documented, thus subject to conjecture and estimation.

Size of various saltwater crocodile specimens compared to a human

The saltwater crocodile is considered to be the largest extant reptile, verified at up to 6.32 m (20.7 ft) in length and around 1,000–1,500 kg (2,200–3,300 lb) in mass. Larger specimens have been reported albeit not fully verified, the maximum of which is purportedly 7 m (23 ft) long with an estimated mass of 2,000 kg (4,400 lb).

The following table below lists the 15 largest extant reptile species ranked according to their average mass range, with maximum reported/reliable/estimated mass also being provided.

== Overall ==
| Rank | Species | Image | Mass range [kg] | Maximum mass [kg] | Maximum length [m] |
|---|---|---|---|---|---|
| 1 | Saltwater crocodile | Kakadu_3620 | 400 – 1,300 | 2,000 | 7 |
| 2 | Nile crocodile | NileCrocodile—Etiopia-Omo-River-Valley-01 | 250 – 900 | 1,090 | 6.5 |
| 3 | American crocodile | Crocodylus_acutus_jalisco_mexico | 150 – 600 | 1,283 | 7 |
| 4 | Orinoco crocodile | Orinoco_crocodile_Cocodrilo_del_Orinoco_(Crocodylus_intermedius) | 200 – 700 | 1,100 | 7 |
| 5 | Black caiman | Jacaré_Açú | 300 – 500 | 1,100 | 6 |
| 6 | American alligator | Two_american_alligators | 200 – 500 | 1,000 | 5.8 |
| 7 | Gharial | Gavialis_gangeticus_in_Prague_Zoo | 160 – 680 | 1,000 | 7 |
| 8 | Leatherback sea turtle | Close_up_of_Leatherback_turtle_-_DPLA_-_d4ddd2fbaacd1721cf967f9263e08909 | 200 – 500 | 961.1 | 3 |
| 9 | False gharial | Onechte_Gaviaal_(7815437740) | 100 – 590 | 800 | 7 |
| 10 | Mugger crocodile | Mugger_crocodile_(Crocodylus_palustris)_walking | 160 – 450 | 700 | 5.63 |
| 11 | Slender-snouted crocodile | Krokodýl_štítnatý | 125 - 325 | 667 | 4.5 |
| 12 | Loggerhead sea turtle | Loggerhead_Sea_Turtle-Caretta_caretta_(17298266875) | 100 – 350 | 545 | 2.1 |
| 13 | Green sea turtle | Chelonia_mydas_183369049 | 100–320 | 500 | 1.8 |
| 14 | Galapagos tortoise | Chelonoidis_porteri_114750622 | 150 – 300 | 417 | 1.8 |
| 15 | Aldabra giant tortoise | Aldabra_giant_tortoise_2 | 132 – 250 | 360 | 1.5 |

== Lizards and snakes (Squamata) ==
=== Snakes ===
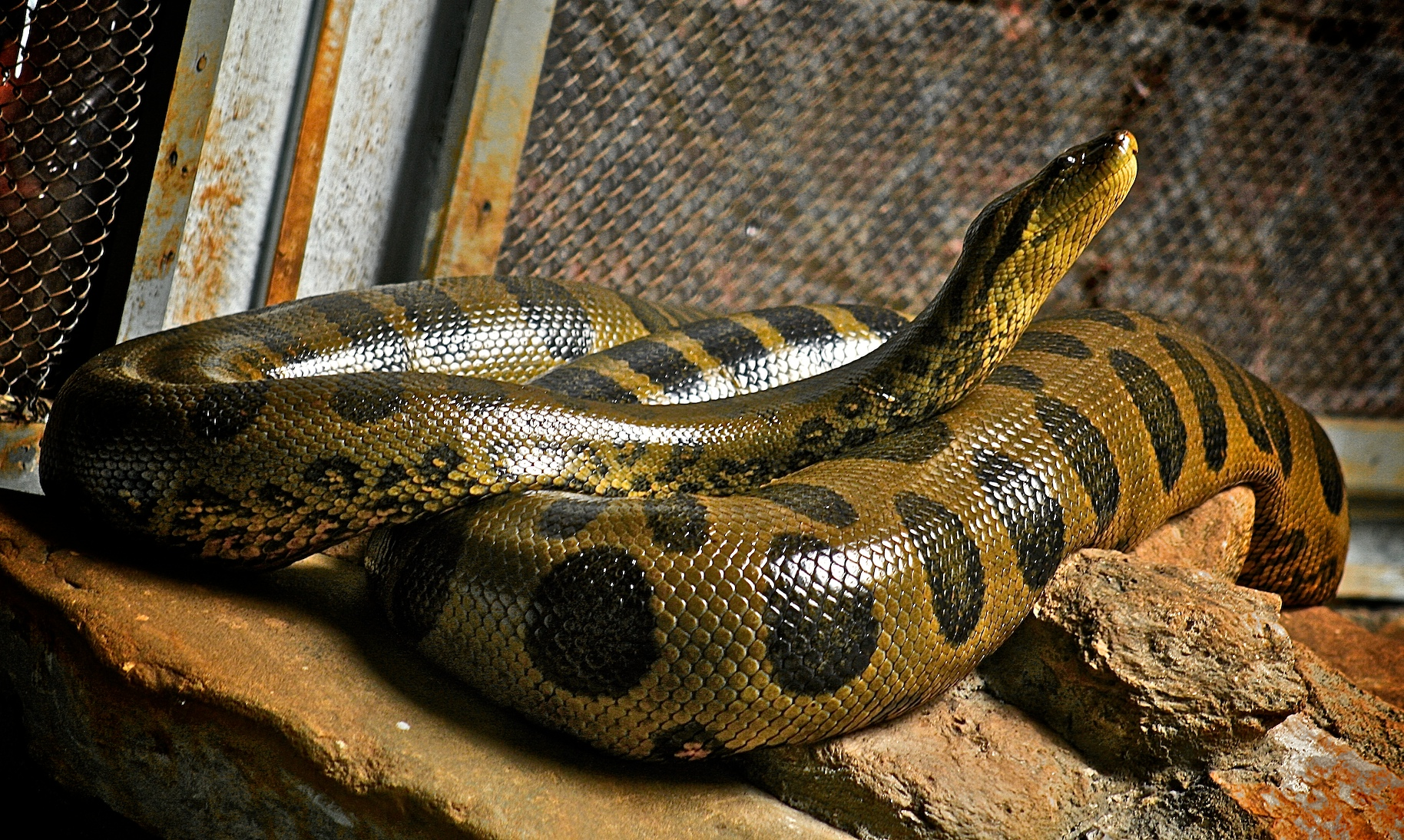
The green anaconda is the most massive living snake.

- The most massive living member of this highly diverse reptilian order is the green anaconda (Eunectes murinus) of the neotropical riverways. These may exceed 6 m (20 ft) and 200 kg (440 lb), although such reports are not fully verified. Rumors of larger anacondas also persist. The reticulated python (Malayopython reticulatus) of Southeast Asia is longer but more slender, and has been reported to measure as much as 8 m (26 ft) in length and weigh up to 168 kg (370 lb). The Burmese python, a south-east Asian species is known to reach up to 6 m (20 ft) and weigh as much as 150 kg (330 lb) and is generally among the three heaviest species of snakes. Several other species of python can reach or exceed 6 m (20 ft) in length and 90 kg (200 lb) in weight. Fossils of what may be the largest snake ever, the extinct boa Titanoboa were found in coal mines in Colombia. It has been estimated to reach a length of 12.8 m (42 ft) and weighed about 1,135 kg (2,502 lb). Length estimates for another very long extinct snake, the madtsoiid Vasuki indicus of India, range from 10.9–15.2 metres (36–50 ft).

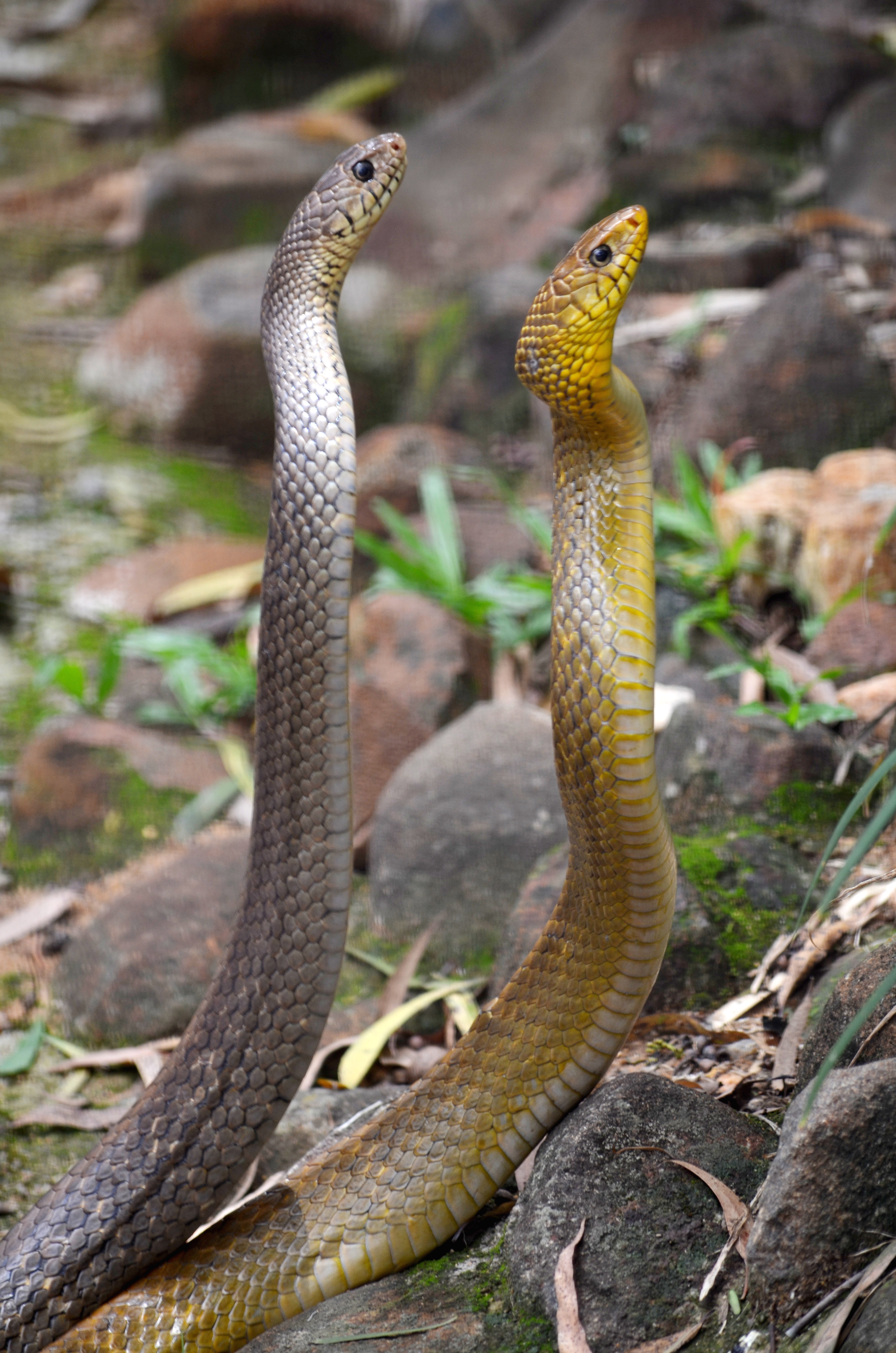
The Indian rat snake is among the largest species in the family Colubridae.

- Among the colubrids, the most diverse snake family, the largest snake may be the keeled rat snake (Ptyas carinata) at up to 4 m (13 ft). The Indian rat snake (Ptyas mucosa) is also very large with maximum sizes of up to 3.7 m (12 ft), making it the second-largest species in the genus Ptyas. The Tiger rat snake (Spilotes pullatus), which usually grows to about 3 m (10 ft), has been reported to reach up to 4.2 m (14 ft), ranking it among the largest colubrids. The genus Drymarchon also contains some of the largest colubrids such as the Eastern indigo snake and the indigo snake (Drymarchon corais) which can both reach lengths of more than 3 m (10 ft). Few other species in the colubrid family (such as False water cobra, Brown tree snake and Pseustes sulphureus) can reach lengths of 3 m (10 ft), but they are relatively slender and generally do not exceed 5 kg (11 lb) in weight.

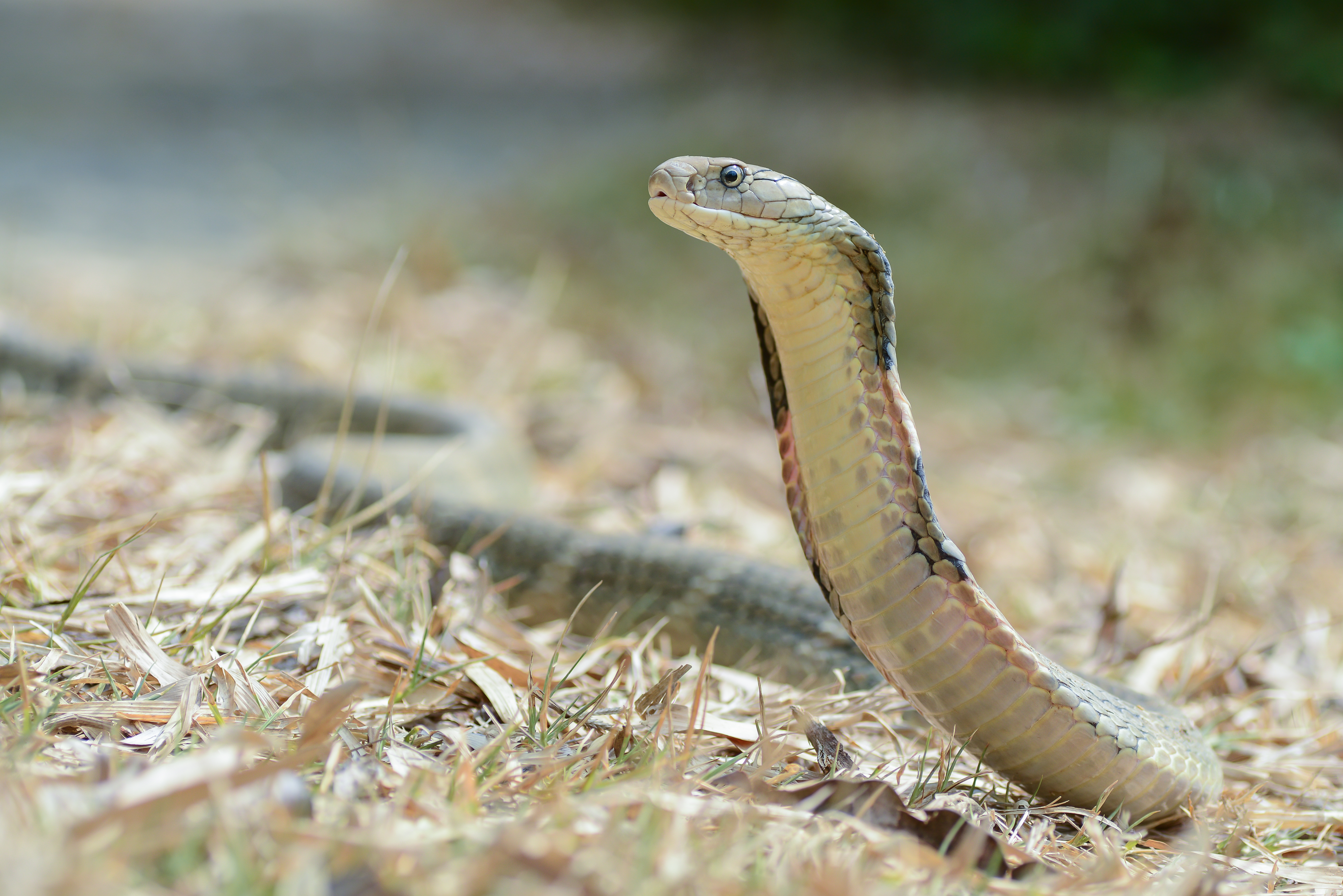
The king cobra is the longest venomous snake in the world.

- The longest venomous snake is the king cobra (Ophiophagus hannah), with lengths (recorded in captivity) of up to 5.7 m (19 ft) and a weight of up to 12.7 kg (28 lb). It is also the largest elapid. The second-longest venomous snake in the world is possibly the African black mamba (Dendroaspis polylepis), which can grow up to 4.5 m (15 ft). Among the genus Naja, the longest member arguably may be the forest cobra (Naja melanoleuca), which can reportedly grow up to 3.2 m (10.5 ft). The King brown snake, reaching lengths of up to 3.3 m (11 ft) and weights of 8 kg (18 lb) or more, is the largest venomous snake in Australia. The Yellow sea snake (Hydrophis spiralis) is the largest of the sea snakes growing up to a length of 3 m (10 ft). Few other elapids can reach or exceed 3 m (10 ft) in length and 9 kg (20 lb) in weight.

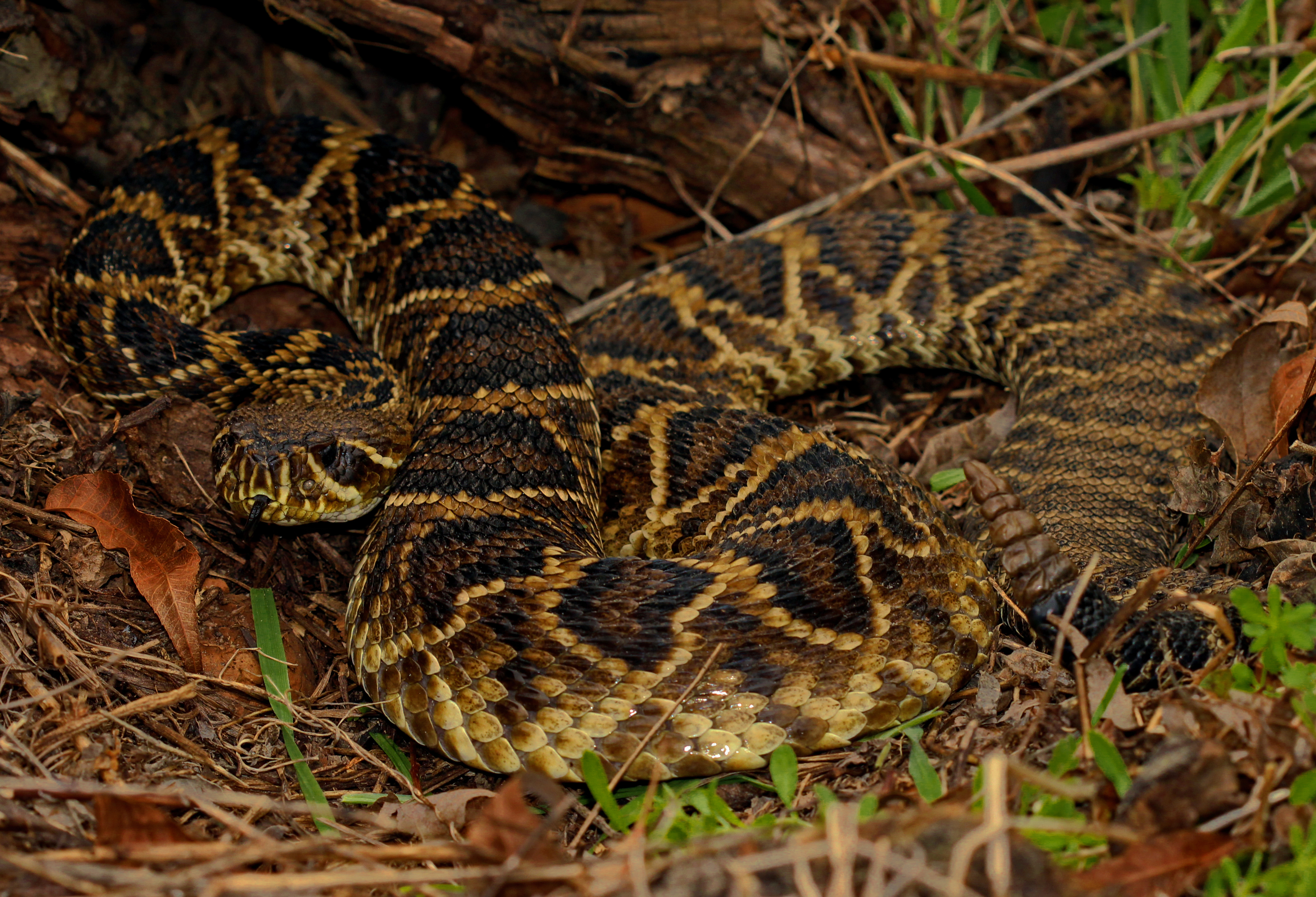
The eastern diamondback rattlesnake is one of the heaviest venomous snakes in the world.

- The Gaboon viper, a very bulky species with a maximum length of around 2.1 m (7 ft), is typically the heaviest non-constrictor snake and the biggest member of the viper family, with unverified specimens reported to as much as 20 kg (44 lb). The Eastern diamondback rattlesnake is nearly as large, with the maximum length being 2.4 m (8 ft) and maximum weight being 15.4 kg (34 lb). The rattlesnake genus Crotalus, which includes the aforementioned eastern diamondback rattlesnake and western diamondback rattlesnake (Crotalus atrox), reaches a maximum length of 2.13 m (7 ft), and according to W. A. King one large specimen had a length of 2.26 m (7.4 ft) and a mass of 11 kg (24 lb). The third largest rattlesnake is the Mexican west coast rattlesnake (Crotalus basiliscus), which reaches 2.04 m (7 ft) long and 7.7 kg (17 lb) mass, and one captive-raised male was weighed at 8.8 kg (19.4 lb) in 2020. While not quite as heavy, other members of the viper family are longer still, the South American bushmaster (Lachesis muta) and Central American bushmaster (Lachesis stenophrys), with a maximum length in the range of 3 to 4 m (10 to 13 ft), with the former being considered as the third-longest venomous snake in the world.

=== Lizards ===
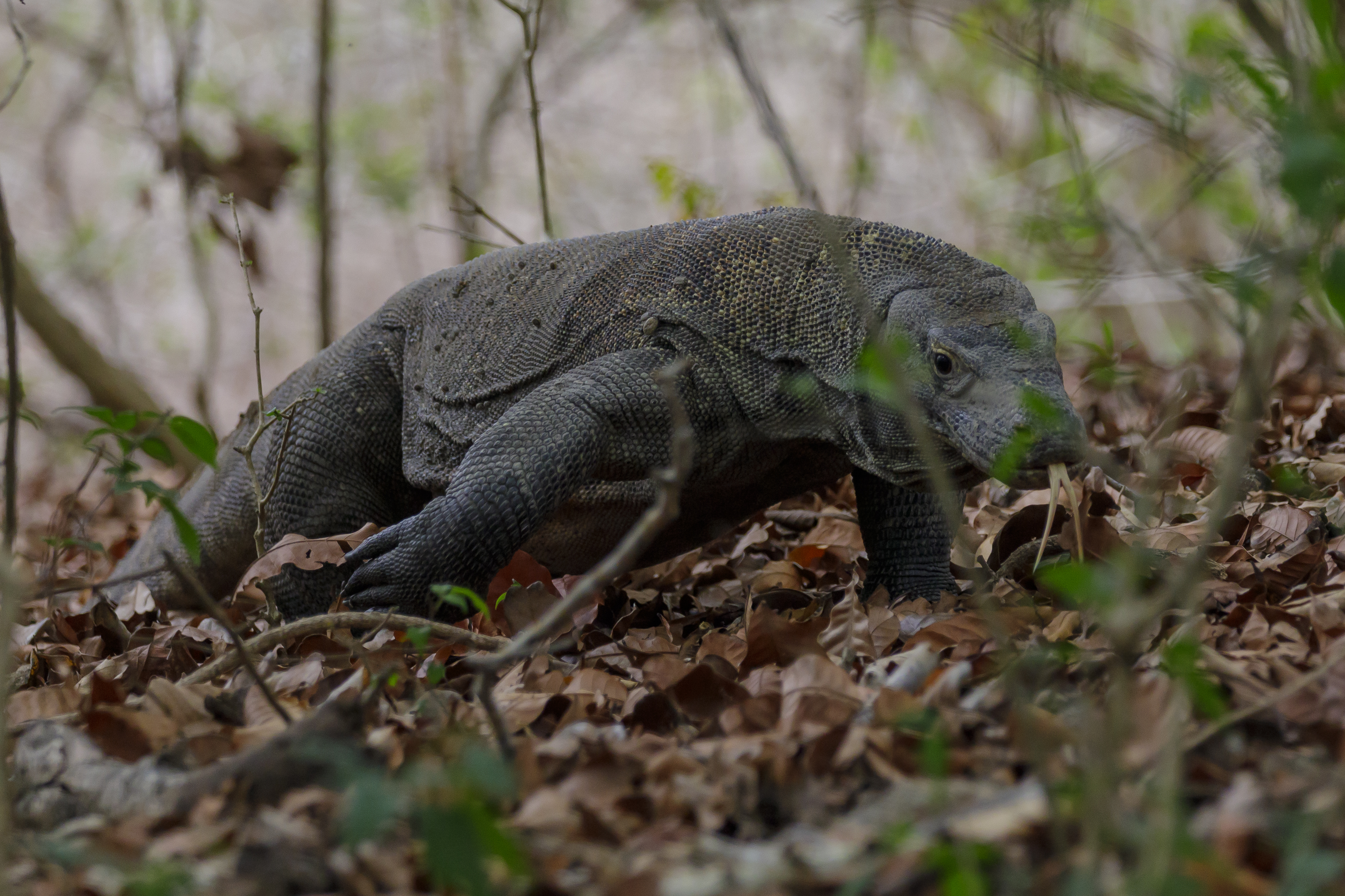
The Komodo dragon is the largest living species of lizard in the world.

- The largest of the monitor lizards (and the largest extant lizard in genera) is the Komodo dragon (Varanus komodoensis), endemic to the island of its name, at a maximum size of 3.13 m (10.3 ft) long and 166 kg (366 lb), although this is currently the only record that places the mass above 100 kg (220 lb). Crocodile monitor (Varanus salvadorii) is probably the longest extant lizard, known to grow as much as 3.23 m (10.6 ft), with reported lengths of up to 4.8 m (16 ft) and weights of up to 90 kg (200 lb). The Asian water monitor is also one of the largest lizards in the world, with sizes of up to 3.21 m (10.5 ft) and reported weights of up to 90 kg (200 lb). Few other species (such as perentie and nile monitor) can reach or possibly exceed 2.4 m (8 ft) in length and 20 kg (44 lb) in weight. The prehistoric Australian megalania (Varanus priscus), which may have existed up to 40,000 years ago, is the largest terrestrial lizard known to exist, but the lack of a complete skeleton has resulted in a wide range of size estimates. Molnar's 2004 assessment resulted in an average weight of 320 kg (710 lb) and length of 4.5 m (15 ft), and a maximum of 1,940 kg (4,280 lb) at 7 m (23 ft) in length, which is toward the high end of the early estimates.

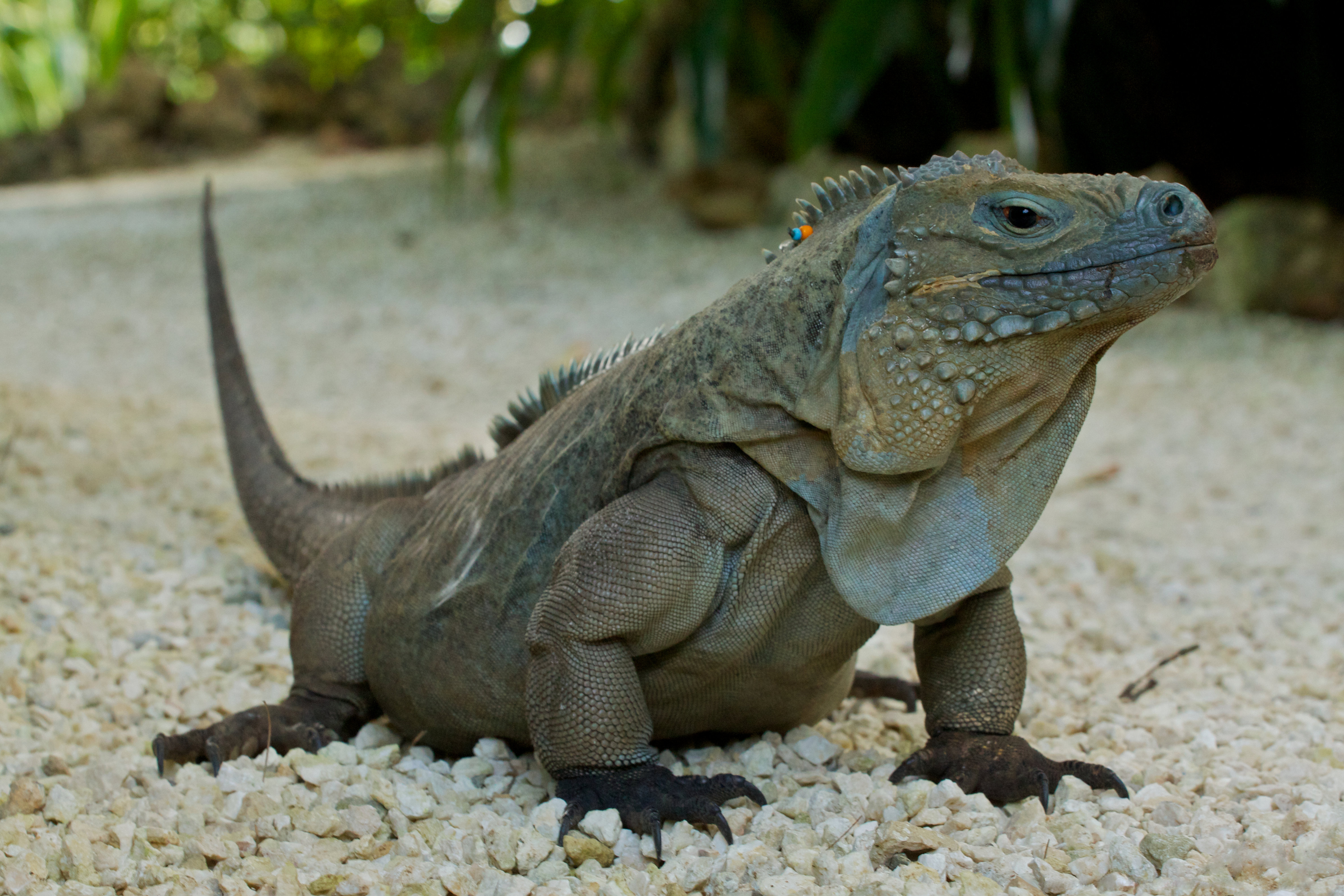
The blue iguana is the most massive extant iguana.

- Iguanas are very large lizards, some of which can reach lengths of up to 2 m (6.6 ft) and weigh more than 10 kg (22 lb). They are the largest lizards after some large species of monitor lizards, and the largest lizards in the New World. Iguanas vary considerably in size and form, but even the smallest lizards in this family are still quite large. Many sources describe the green iguana (Iguana iguana) as the largest iguanid, often reaching lengths up to 1.5 metres (4.91 ft) and masses of 4 kg (8.8 lb), and with a maximum length of 2 m (6.6 ft) and a mass of 8 kg (18 lb) and in some cases even 9.1 kg (20 lb). However, the heaviest species in this family is the blue iguana (Cyclura lewisi), with a total length of up to 1.5 m (4.91 ft), a SVL of 51–76 cm (30 in) and a mass of up to 14 kg (31 lb) It is the eighth-heaviest and largest extant lizard. Other large species in this family include the Galapagos land iguana (Conolophus subcristataus), with a length of about 1.5 m (4.91 ft) and a mass of up to 13 kg (29 lb). It is the second-heaviest iguanid after the blue iguana and the ninth-heaviest and largest lizard in the world. Another large species from the same genus is the Santa Fe land iguana (Conolophus pallidus), reaching a SVL of 56.4 cm (22.2 in) and a mass of 7.2 kg (16 lb). The Galapagos pink land iguana (Conolophus marthae) have snout-vent length 57.5 cm (22.6 in) and the mass of 8 kg (18 lb). The marine iguana (Amblyrhynchus cristatus) is also among the largest iguanas in the world, and the largest reptile on Galapagos Islands after the Galapagos land iguana, not including turtles reaching a maximum total length of 1.4 m (4.59 ft), a SVL of from 12 till 56 cm (from 4.72 till 22 in) and a mass of from 1 to 12 kg (2.2 to 26.5 lb) depending on islands.
- The largest extant gecko is the New Caledonian giant gecko (Rhacodactylus leachianus) of New Caledonia, which can grow to 14 inches in length. It was surpassed in size by the extinct Kawekaweau (Hoplodactylus delcourti) of New Zealand, which grew to a length of 580 mm (23 in).

=== Mosasaurs ===
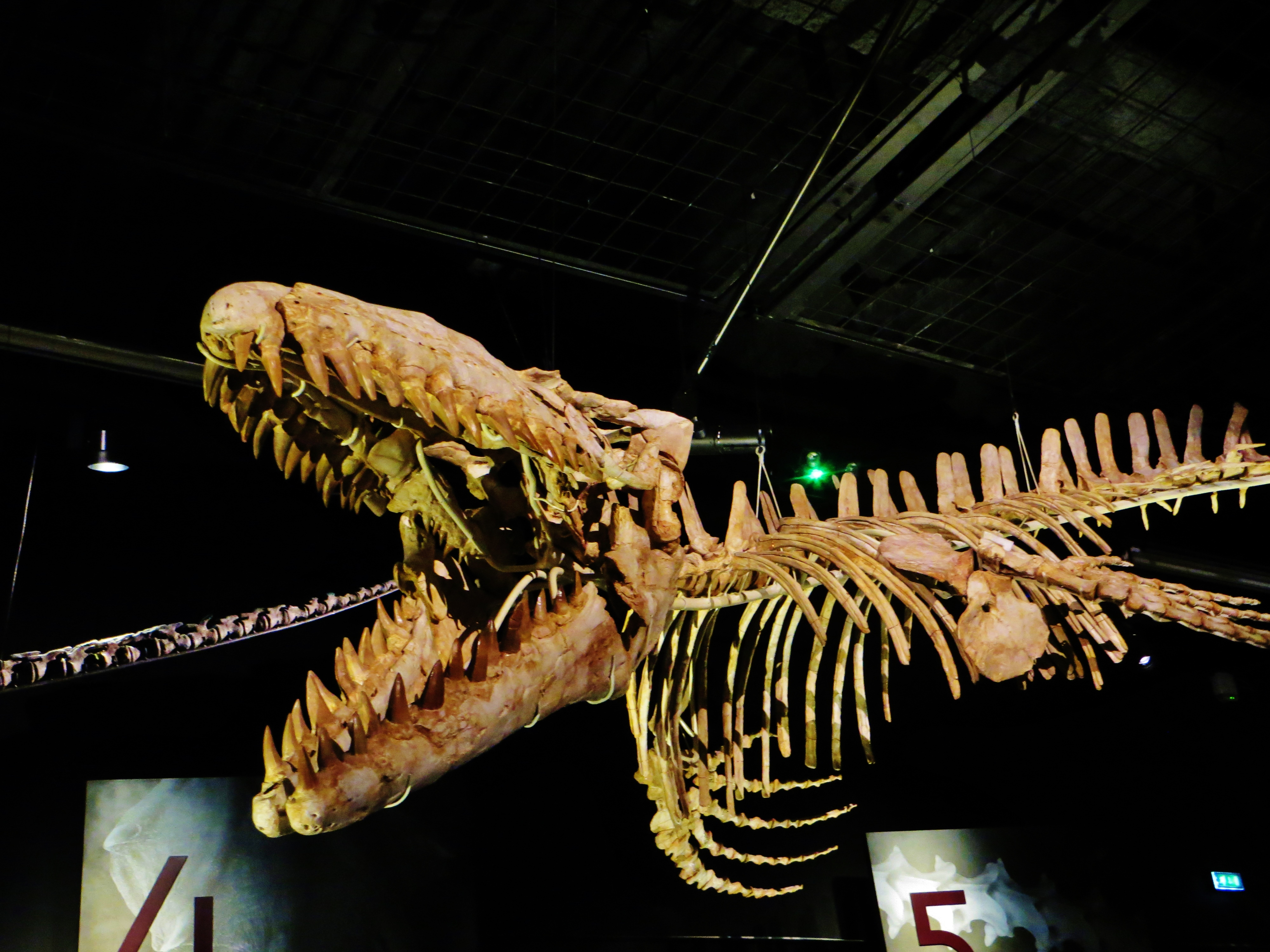
Skeletal mount of Mosasaurus, the largest known mosasaur and squamate.

- The largest members of this order were the giant mosasaurs (including Hainosaurus, Mosasaurus, and Tylosaurus), which grew to around 17 m (56 ft) and were projected to weigh up to 20 t (44,000 lb).

== Tuataras (Sphenodontia) ==
The larger of the two extant species of the New Zealand native tuataras is the Brothers Island tuatara (Sphenodon guntheri). The maximum size is 1.4 kg (3.1 lb) and 76 cm (30 in).

== Ichthyosaurs (Ichthyosauria) ==
Ichthyotitan, one of the largest marine reptiles to ever exist

Some of these marine reptiles were comparable in size to modern cetaceans. Until 2024, the largest ichthyosaur was believed to be the Late Triassic species Shastasaurus sikanniensis, at approximately 21 m (69 ft) long and 81.5 t (180,000 lb) in weight, from the Norian stage in what is now British Columbia. However, in 2018, a specimen from the Rhaetian stage of Lilstock was discovered to be 25 percent larger, approximately 26 m (85 ft) in length. The specimen was referred in 2024 to Ichthyotitan severnensis, with revised estimates of 25 metres (82 ft) making it the largest known marine reptile. Shonisaurus popularis is another enormous ichthyosaur. It reached 15 m (49 ft) in length and 29.7 t (65,000 lb) in weight. Cymbospondylus youngorum is the largest Middle Triassic ichthyosaur, with 17.65 m (57.9 ft) in length and 45 t (99,000 lb) in weight. In 2022 the tooth of a giant predatory ichthyosaur (unofficially named Swiss Tyrant) was discovered in the Swiss Alps. Based on crown diameter, the animal was about 18 m (59 ft) long and weighed 55 t (121,000 lb), making it one of the largest marine reptiles ever.

== Pantestudines ==
=== Turtles and tortoises (Testudines) ===
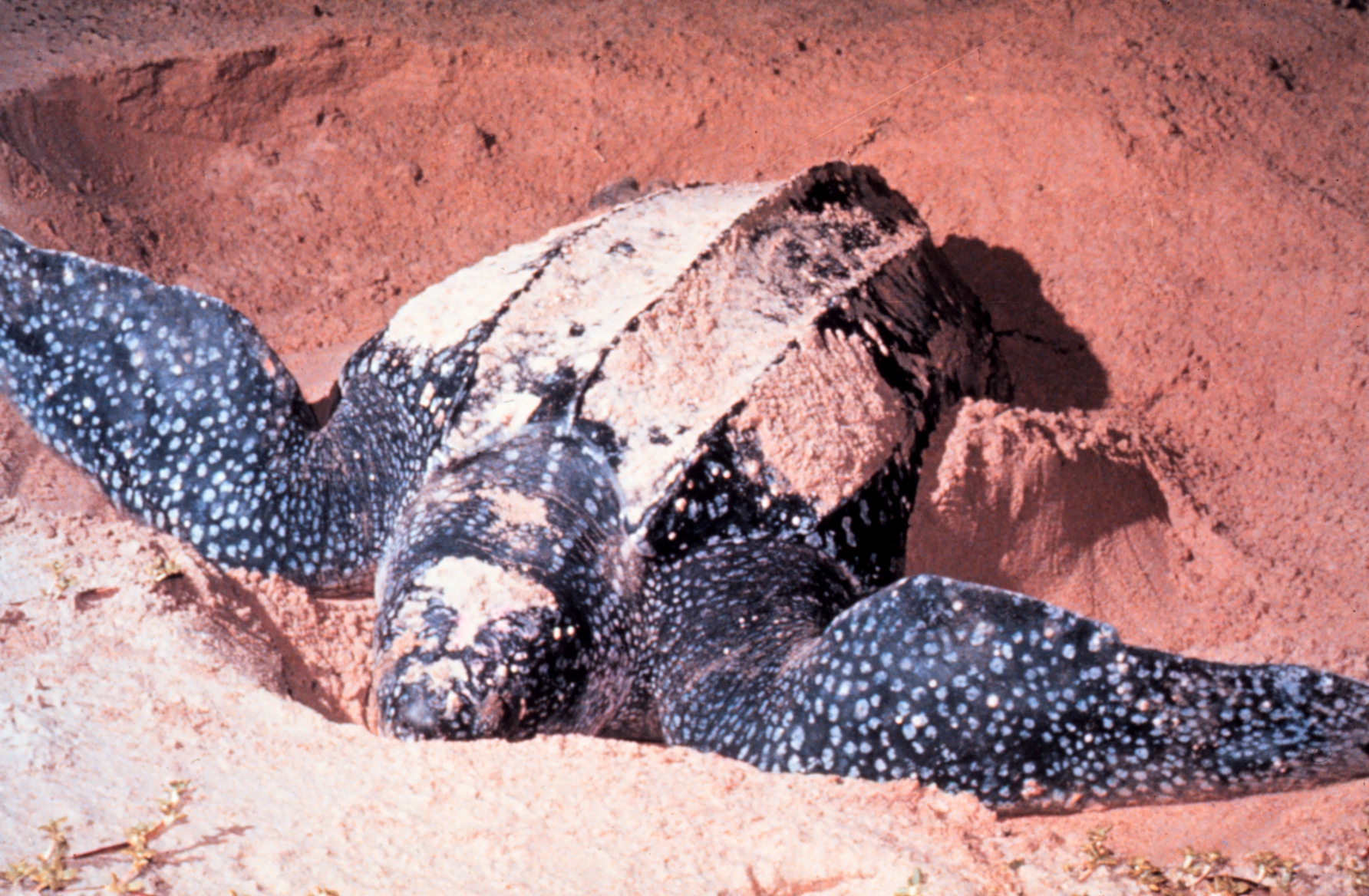
The giant leatherback sea turtle, the largest extant turtle, digs a nest on the beach.

- The largest extant turtle is the leatherback sea turtle (Dermochelys coriacea), reaching a maximum total length of 3 m (10 ft) and a weight of 961 kg (2,119 lb). The second-largest extant testudine is the Loggerhead sea turtle. It tends to weigh slightly more on average than the green sea turtle, and reaches more massive top sizes. The Loggerhead sea turtle (Caretta caretta) reaches a maximum size of 2.1 m (7 ft) and weight of 545 kg (1,202 lb), while the Green sea turtle (Chelonia mydas) reaches a maximum weight in the range of 395 to 500 kg (871 to 1,102 lb). The Flatback sea turtle (Natator depressus) may reach a weight of up to 350 kg (770 lb). Other species of Sea turtles are small-medium in size, but are still considered as large-sized for a typical turtle.

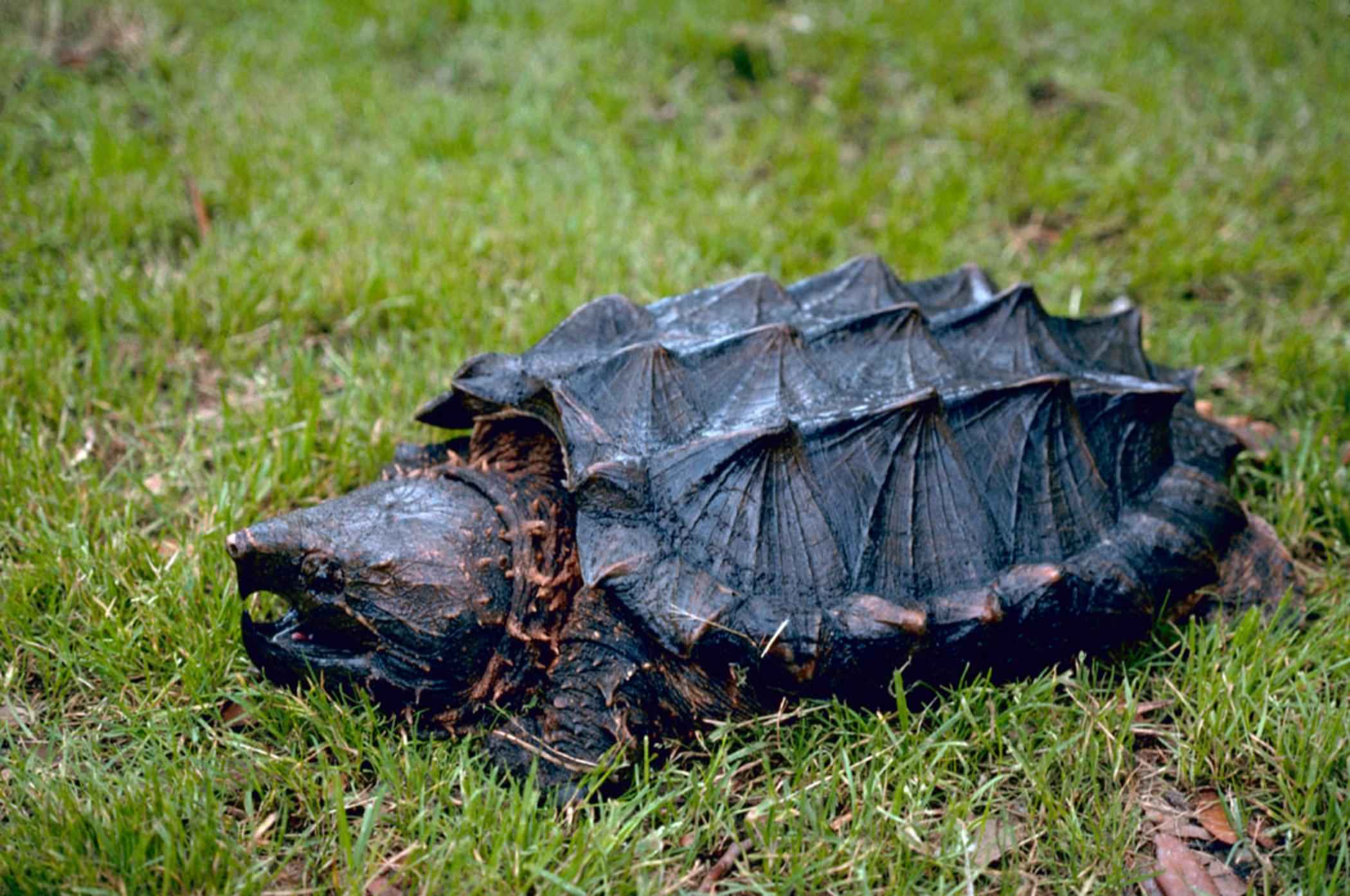
The alligator snapping turtle is the largest extant freshwater turtle in North America.

- The largest extant freshwater turtle is possibly the North American alligator snapping turtle (Macrochelys temminckii), which has an unverified maximum reported weight of 183 kg (403 lb), although this is challenged by several rare, giant softshell turtle from Asia (Rafetus and Pelochelys) unverified to 200 kg (440 lb) and nearly 2 m (6 ft 7 in) in total length. The Yangtze giant softshell turtle (Rafetus swinhoei), a critically endangered species of softshell turtle, is sometimes considered as the largest extant freshwater turtle. The heaviest recorded specimen was reported to weigh 250 kg (550 lb). Some researchers have claimed that a related species, the Asian giant softshell turtle (Pelochelys cantorii), is the largest living species of freshwater turtle. However, such claims are fraught with problems, because it now seems likely that this species is actually a composite, i.e., consisting of several separate, presently undifferentiated species that have all been traditionally but erroneously lumped together taxonomically as a single species. In the genus chitra, two species of critically endangered turtles have been reported to grow to massive sizes. The Asian narrow-headed softshell turtle (Chitra chitra), at up to 254 kg (560 lb), and the Indian narrow-headed softshell turtle (Chitra indica), at up to 202 kg (445 lb), are also contenders for the title of the largest extant freshwater turtle.

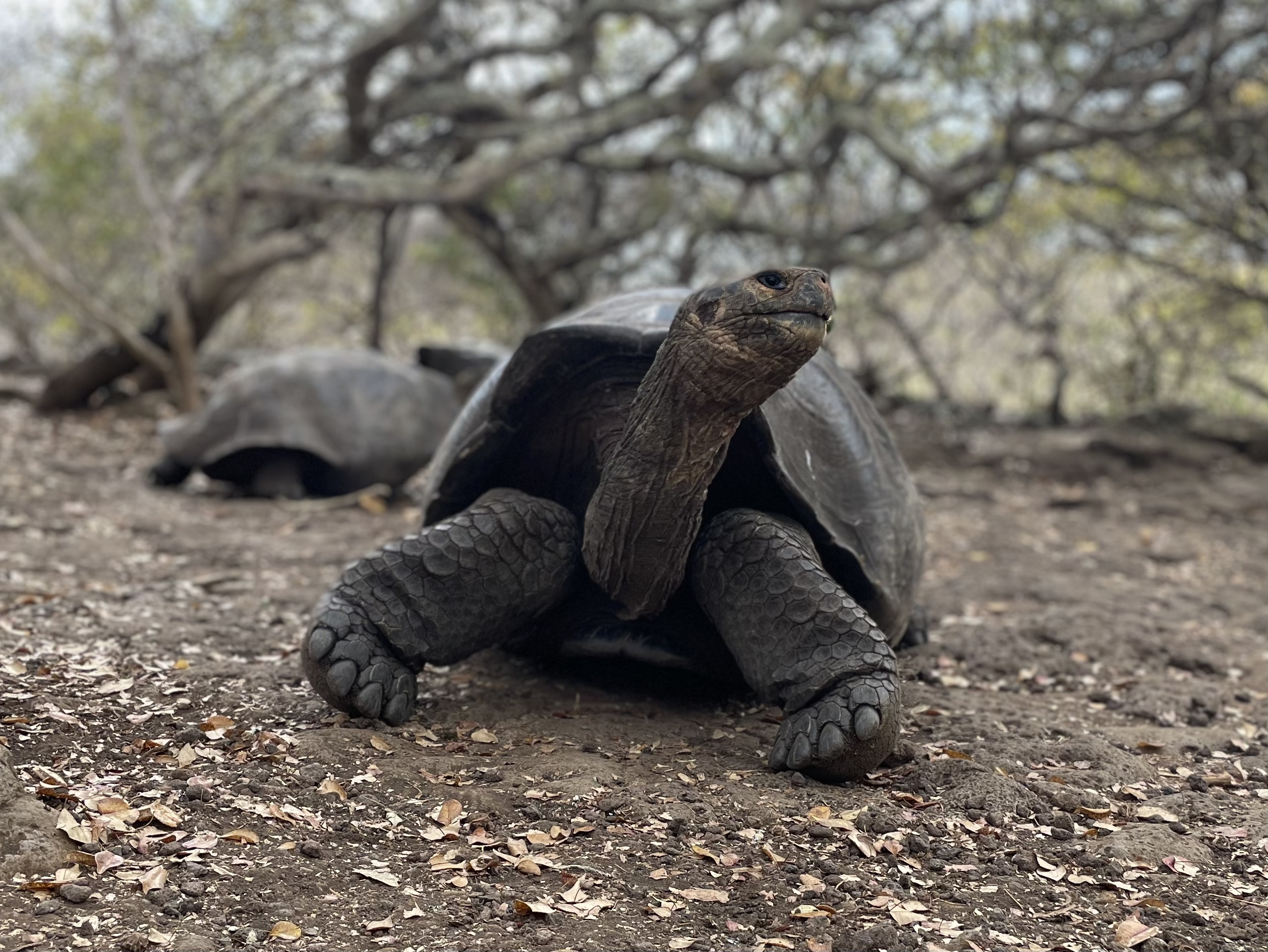
The Galápagos tortoise is the largest living tortoise.

- The Galápagos tortoise (Chelonoidis nigra) and the Aldabra giant tortoise (Aldabrachelys gigantea) are considered the largest truly terrestrial reptiles alive today. While the Aldabra tortoise averages larger at 205 kg (452 lb), the more variable-sized Galapagos tortoise can reach a greater maximum size of 400 kg (880 lb) and 1.85 m (6.1 ft) in total length. The Aldabra giant tortoise has a maximum recorded weight of 363 kg (800 lb). The African spurred tortoise (Centrochelys sulcata) is the third-largest extant tortoise (and the largest mainland tortoise) in the world. The large adults of this species may reach 1 m (3.3 ft) in length and weigh more than 100 kg (220 lb). Other relatively large-sized tortoises include the Yellow-footed tortoise (Chelonoidis denticulatus) and Leopard tortoise (Stigmochelys pardelis), at up to 54 kg (119 lb), and the Asian forest tortoise (Manouria emys), at up to 37 kg (82 lb) or more, can be rather large as well. The tortoise Megalochelys, of the Pleistocene epoch from what is now Pakistan and India, was even larger, at nearly 2.7 m (9 ft) in shell length and 0.8–1.0 t (1,800–2,200 lb).

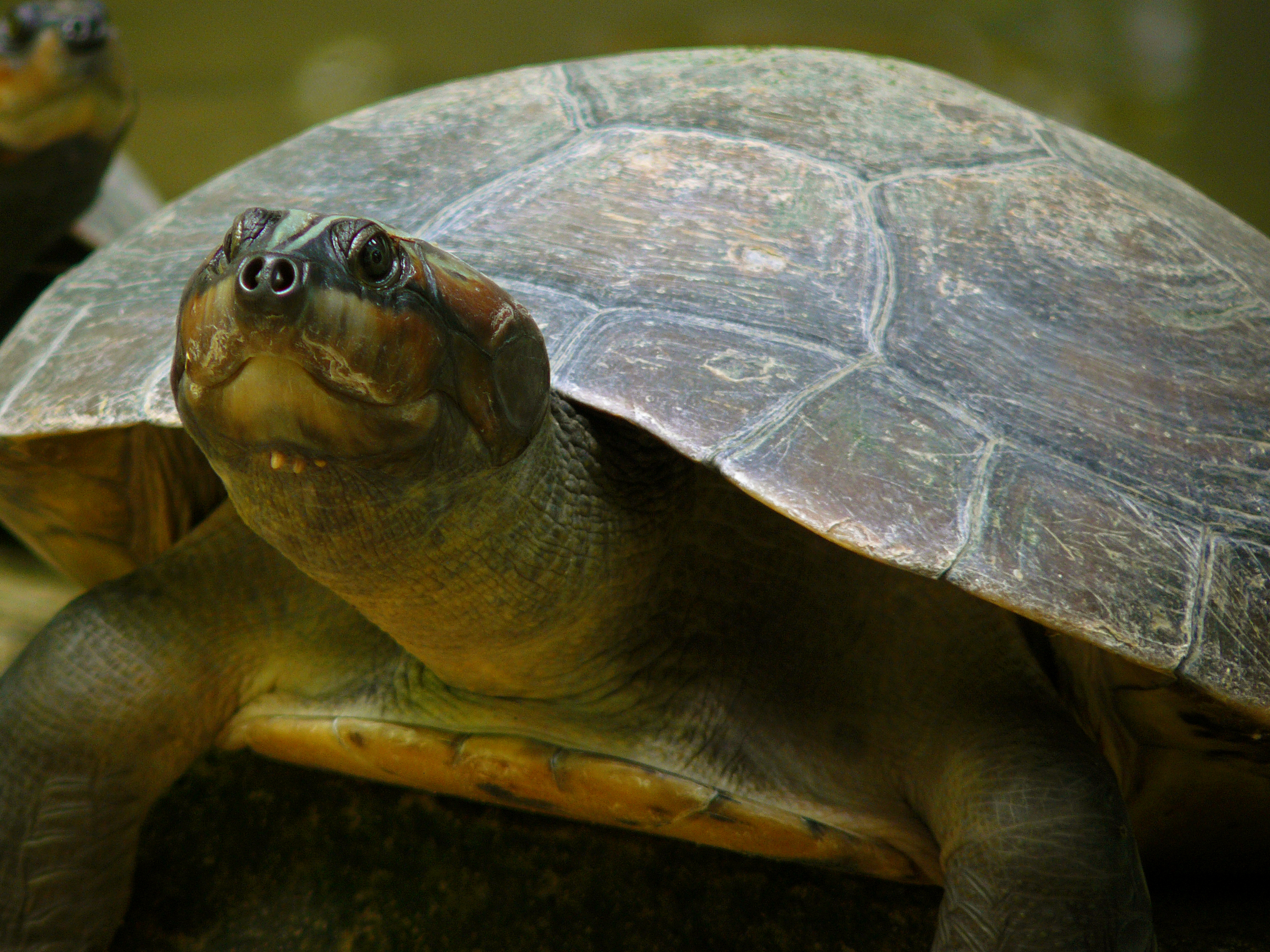
The Arrau turtle (Podocnemis expansa) is the largest of the side-necked turtles.

- The largest of side-necked turtles (Pleurodira) is the Arrau turtle (Podocnemis expansa). Its carapace length is up to 1.07 m (3.5 ft) and adults can reach up to 90 kg (200 lb) in weight. There are also reports of these turtles weighing up to 118 kg (260 lb). The Mata mata (Chelus fimbriata) is another large species of side-necked turtle with a carapace length of up to 1 m (3.3 ft) and weight of more than 21 kg (46 lb).

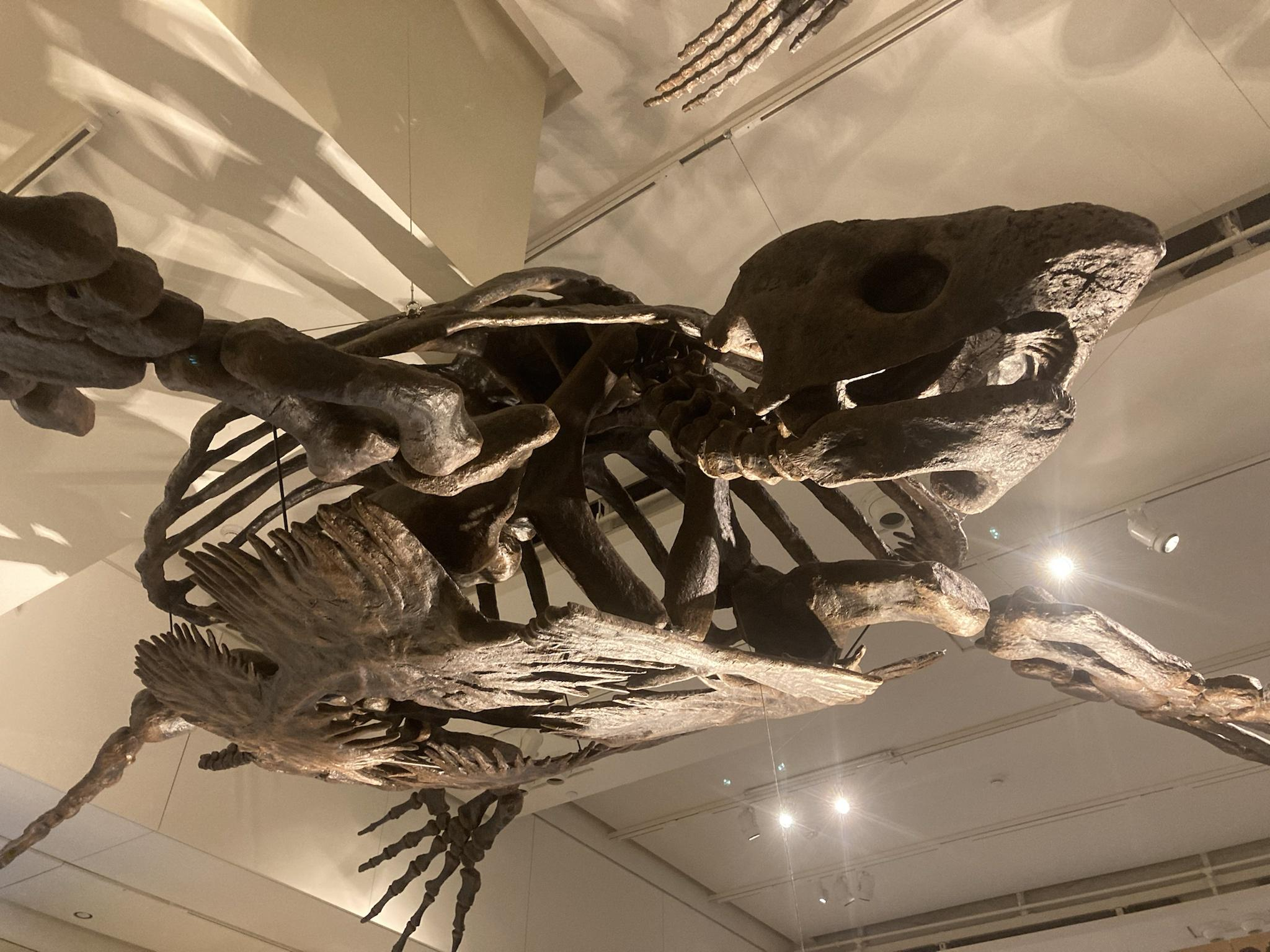
Skeletal mount of Archelon, one of the largest turtles to have ever existed.

- There are many extinct turtles that vie for the title of the largest ever. The largest freshwater turtle seems to be Stupendemys, with an estimated parasagittal carapace length of 2.86 m (9 ft 5 in) and weight of up to 1,145 kg (2,524 lb). A close contender is Archelon ischyros, a sea turtle, which reached a length of 5 m (16 ft) and a weight of 2,200 kg (4,900 lb).

=== Meiolaniformes ===
A terrestrial relative of turtles survived until about 2,000 years ago, the Australasian Meiolania at about 2.6 m (8 ft 6 in) long and a weight of over 1 t (2,200 lb). Later research suggests the maximum length possibly over 3 m (9.8 ft).

== Plesiosaurs (Plesiosauria) ==
Size of Aristonectes compared to a human

Plesiosaurs were aquatic reptiles of the Mesozoic era. They had a broad flat body, a short tail, and strong flippers. Most of the Plesiosauroidea group are identified by their long necks, while Pliosauroidea are usually short-necked. The largest known plesiosauroid is Aristonectes, with a body length of 10–11.86 metres (32.8–38.9 ft) and body mass of 10.7–13.5 t (24,000–30,000 lb). The largest well known pliosauroid is Pliosaurus funkei at 10–13 m (33–43 ft) in length. With a series of neck vertebrae from the Kimmeridge Clay Formation indicate a pliosaur, probably Pliosaurus, that may have been up to 14.4 metres (47 ft) long.

== Crocodilians (Crocodilia) ==
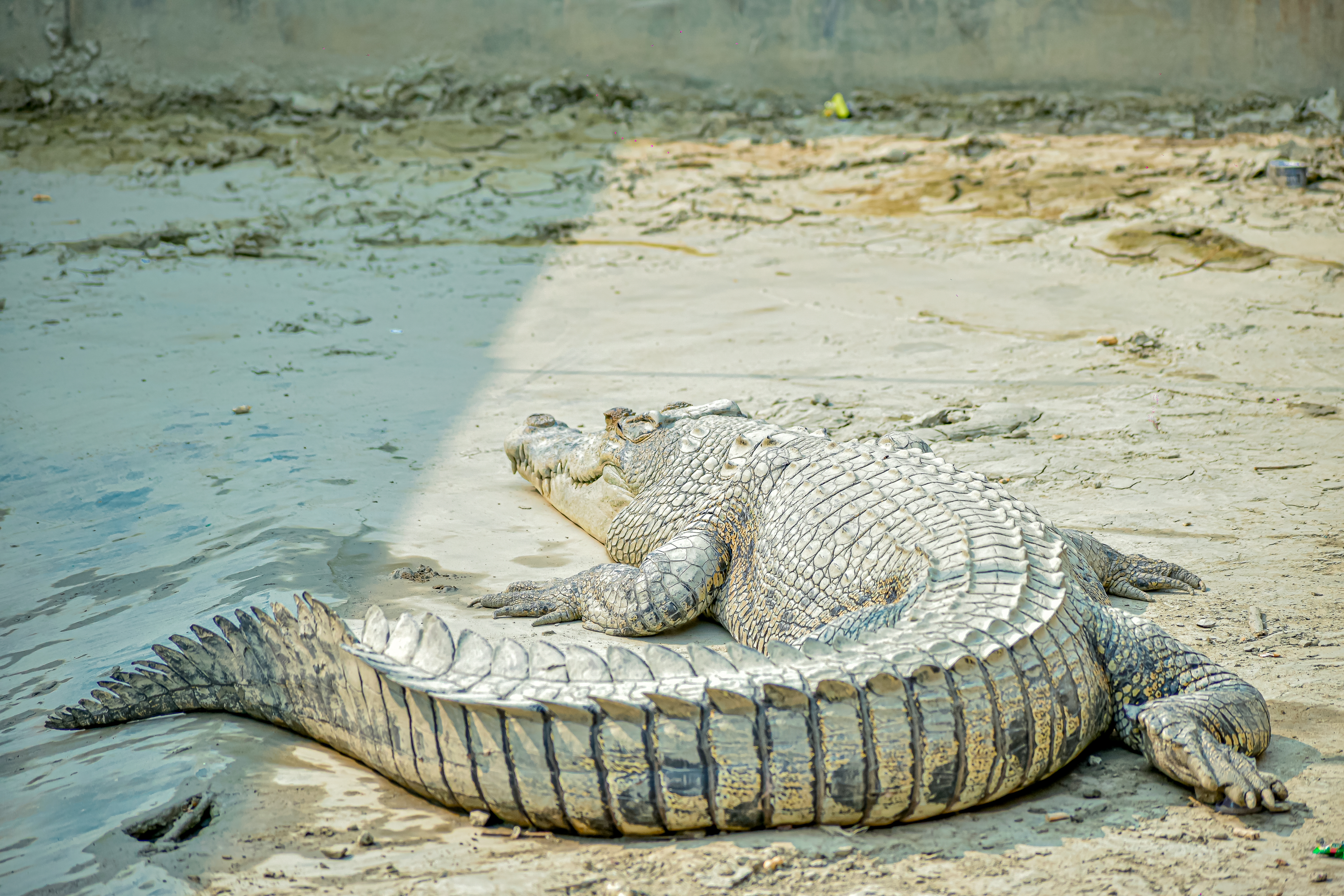
The saltwater crocodile is an apex predator throughout its range and is considered to be the largest extant crocodilian.

- Some species of crocodiles such as Saltwater crocodile (Crocodylus porosus), Nile crocodile (Crocodylus niloticus), American crocodile (Crocodylus acutus) and the critically endangered Orinoco crocodile (Crocodylus intermedius) can reach lengths of 6 m (20 ft) or more. The largest known specimen among the living crocodilians was an Orinoco crocodile with a length of 6.78 m (22.2 ft). One of the largest known Saltwater crocodile measured 6.2 m (20.3 ft) and was shot in Papua New Guinea. A 6.17 m (20.2 ft) long individual was captured alive in Mindanao in 2011. The largest confirmed Saltwater crocodile on record was 6.32 m (20.7 ft) long, and weighed about 1,360 kg (3,000 lb). In 2006, Guinness World Records accepted claims of a 7-metre (23 ft), 2,000-kilogram (4,400 lb) male saltwater crocodile, living within Bhitarkanika National Park. Due to the difficulty of trapping and measuring a large living crocodile, the accuracy of these dimensions is yet to be verified. These observations and estimations have been made by park officials over the course of ten years, from 2006 to 2016, however, regardless of the skill of the observers it cannot be compared to a verified tape measurement, especially considering the uncertainty inherent in visual size estimation in the wild. The largest Nile crocodile accurately measured, shot near Mwanza, Tanzania, measured 6.45 m (21.2 ft) and weighed about 1,043–1,089 kg (2,300–2,400 lb). Another large Nile crocodile specimen was purported to be a man-eater from Burundi named Gustave; it was thought to have been more than 6.1 m (20 ft) long. The American crocodile is also one of the largest crocodile species, with large males in the southern part of their range reported to approach 6.1 m (20 ft) in size. Based on projections from various skulls, the largest males may have reached 6–7 m (20–23 ft) in length, and their predicted mass reached up to 1,283 kg (2,829 lb). Other crocodiles can also grow to large sizes, such the Mugger crocodile, which typically reaches an average maximum length of 4–5 m (13–16 ft), and has a maximum reported length of 5.63 m (18.5 ft). The extinct Crocodylus thorbjarnarsoni was the largest species in its genus, growing up to 7.56 m (24.8 ft) in length. The largest true crocodile ever existed is Euthecodon which estimated to have reached 6.4–8.6 m (21–28 ft) or even 10 m (33 ft) long.

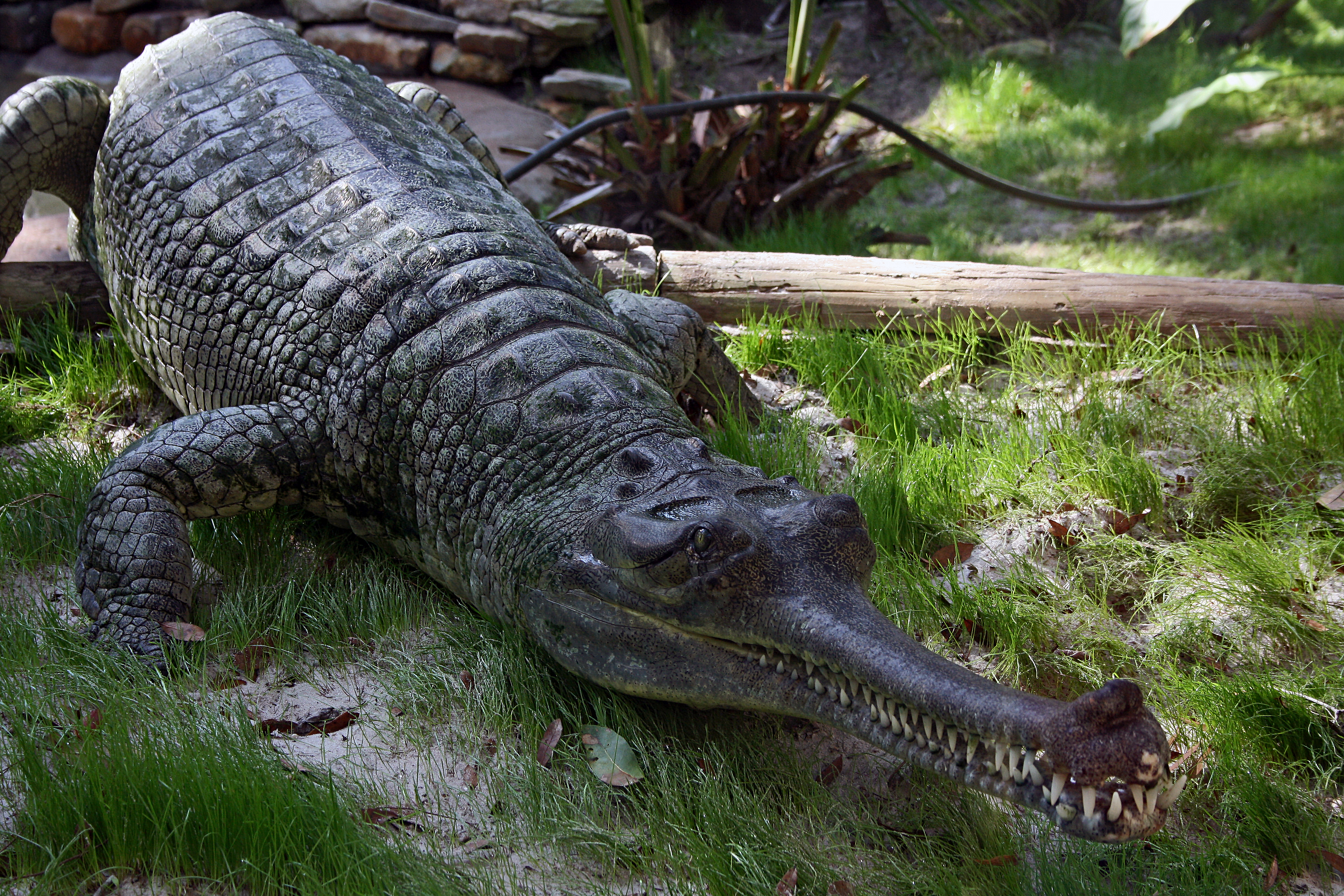
Gharials are long, narrow-snouted crocodilians, and are among the largest species.

- A 6.55 m (21.5 ft) long gharial was killed in the Ghaghara River in Faizabad in August 1920. Male gharials may grow up to a length of 7 m (23 ft). The heaviest recorded gharial was a male measuring 6.25 m (20.5 ft) in total length and weighing 977 kg (2,154 lb). The False gharial is also a large crocodilian with males reaching 5 m (16 ft) in length, weighing up to at least 590 kg (1,300 lb). The largest gavialid to ever exist was the extinct Rhamphosuchus from the Miocene of Asia. It was originally thought to be 18 m (59 ft) long and more than 20 t (44,000 lb) in weight but later estimations suggest 11 m (36 ft) and 2–3 t (4,400–6,600 lb). Based on its fossils, the latter species was less massive and heavy than the other giant crocodilians, weighing an estimated 3 t (6,600 lb).

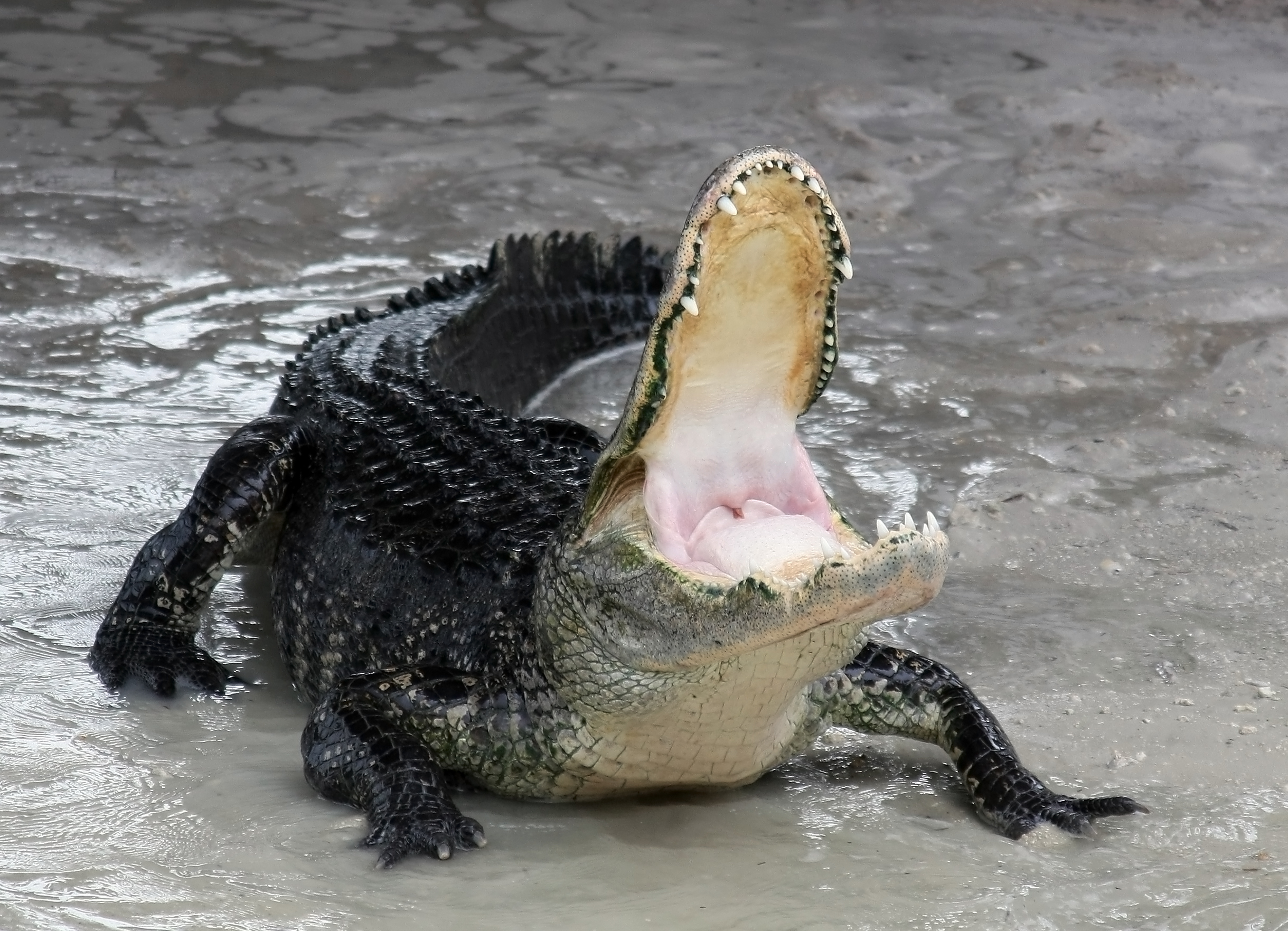
The American alligator is among the largest in the family Alligatoridae.

- The largest member of the family Alligatoridae is the Black caiman (Melanosuchus niger) with the American alligator (Alligator mississippiensis) sometimes growing to similar lengths. Black caimans can reach more than 5 m (16 ft) in length and weigh up to 750 kg (1,650 lb). American alligators can be almost as large, with males reaching 4.6 m (15 ft) in length and weighing over 500 kg (1,100 lb). Unverified reports suggest lengths of up to 6 m (20 ft) for the black caiman and 5.84 m (19.2 ft) for the American alligator, reaching weights of over 1,000 kg (2,200 lb), but such lengths are probably exaggerated.

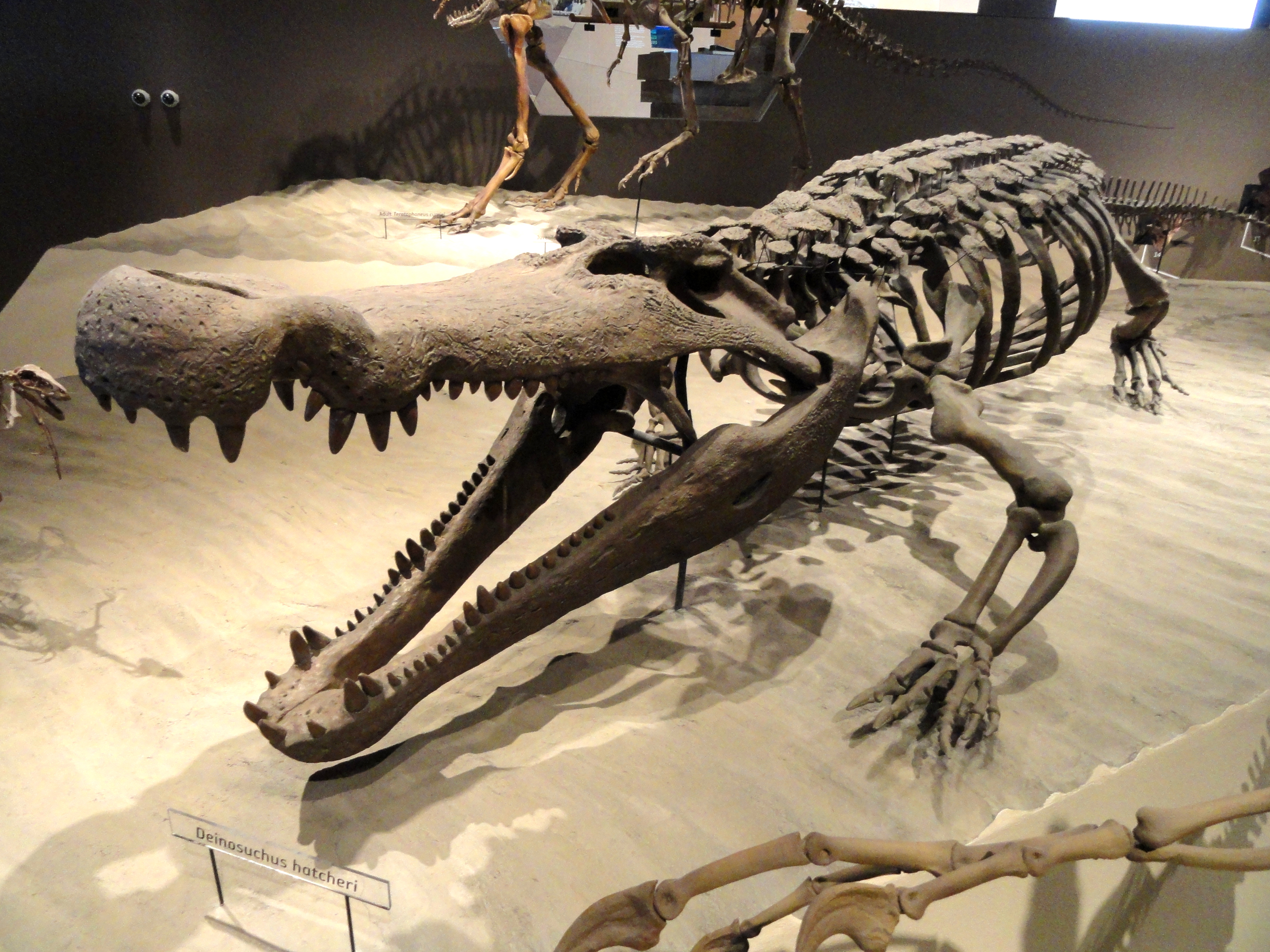
Reconstructed skeleton of Deinosuchus, one of the largest crocodilians to ever exist.

- The giant prehistoric caiman, Purussaurus, from northern South America during the Miocene epoch grew up to 9–10 m (30–33 ft) long and could weigh up to 8 tonnes, making it one of the largest crocodilians ever. Other contenders for the largest crocodilian ever include the late Cretaceous period Deinosuchus who according to a 2025 study D. riograndensis reached total lengths of 10.5 meters (34 ft) Sarcosuchus imperator of the early Cretaceous was found in the Sahara desert and could measure up to 9–9.5 m (30–31 ft) and weigh an estimated 3.5 t (7,700 lb).

== Pterosaurs (Pterosauria) ==
A Mesozoic reptile is believed to have been the largest flying animal that ever existed: the pterosaur Quetzalcoatlus northropi, from North America during the late Cretaceous. This species is believed to have weighed up to 126 kg (278 lb), measured 7.9 m (26 ft) in total length (including a neck length of over 3 m (9.8 ft)) and measured up to 10–12 m (33–39 ft) across the wings. Another possible contender for the largest pterosaur is Hatzegopteryx, which is estimated to have had an 11–12 m (36–39 ft) wingspan. An unnamed Mongolian pterodactyloid pterosaur and Arambourgiania from Jordan could reach a wingspan of nearly 10 m (33 ft).

== Non-avian dinosaurs (Dinosauria) ==
Size of the longest dinosaur in several clades compared to a human

- The main contender for the largest sauropod and the longest known vertebrate is Bruhathkayosaurus matleyi known from now disentereated remains which was upto 40 m (130 ft) in length and 110–130 t (240,000–290,000 lb) in weight. With paleontologist Michael Benton, giving Bruhathkayosaurus a length of 45 metres (148 ft). Another large sauropod is Maraapunisaurus fragillimus. Known only by lost vertebra, it was estimated at 58 m (190 ft) in length and 122.4 t (270,000 lb) in weight but later studies suggest smaller size, about 35 m (115 ft) in length and 70–95 t (154,000–209,000 lb) in weight. Breviparopus taghbaloutensis was mentioned in The Guinness Book of Records as the longest dinosaur at 48 m (157 ft) but this animal is known only from fossil tracks. In 2020 Molina Perez & Larramendi suggested that the narrow-gauge track, the position of the claws, and the era all indicate that it belonged to an enormous diplodocoid, and estimated its size at 33.5 m (110 ft) and 62 t (68 short tons). The better studied Supersaurus was possibly as long as over 40 m (130 ft). One of the heaviest sauropods was Argentinosaurus at 35 m (115 ft) in length and 65–75 t (143,000–165,000 lb) or even 100 t (220,000 lb) in body mass. The tallest sauropods were probably Xinjiangtitan and Sauroposeidon with total height of 17 m (56 ft) and 16.5–18 m (54–59 ft), respectively.
- The largest non-avian theropod was Tyrannosaurus rex, estimated at 12.1-12.2 m (40 ft) in length and around 8–10.6 t (18,000–23,000 lb) in weight.
- The largest thyreophoran was Ankylosaurus at 9 m (30 ft) in length and 6 t (13,000 lb) in weight.
- The largest ceratopsian was Triceratops, reaching 8–9 m (26–30 ft) in length and 5–9 t (11,000–20,000 lb) in weight.
- The largest ornithopod was the Late Cretaceous Shantungosaurus at up to 23 t (51,000 lb), and 16.6 m (54 ft) in length.
