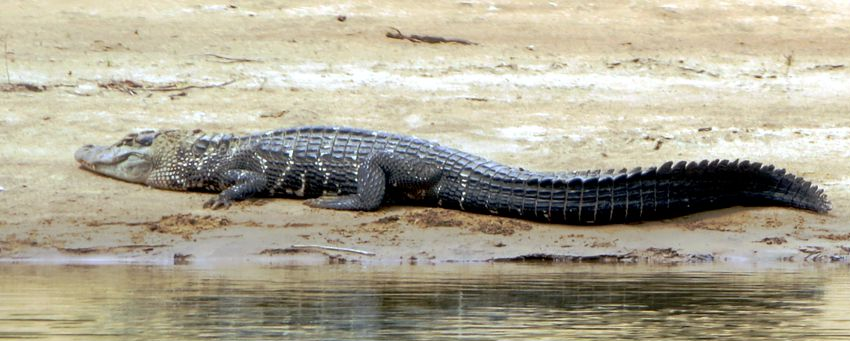

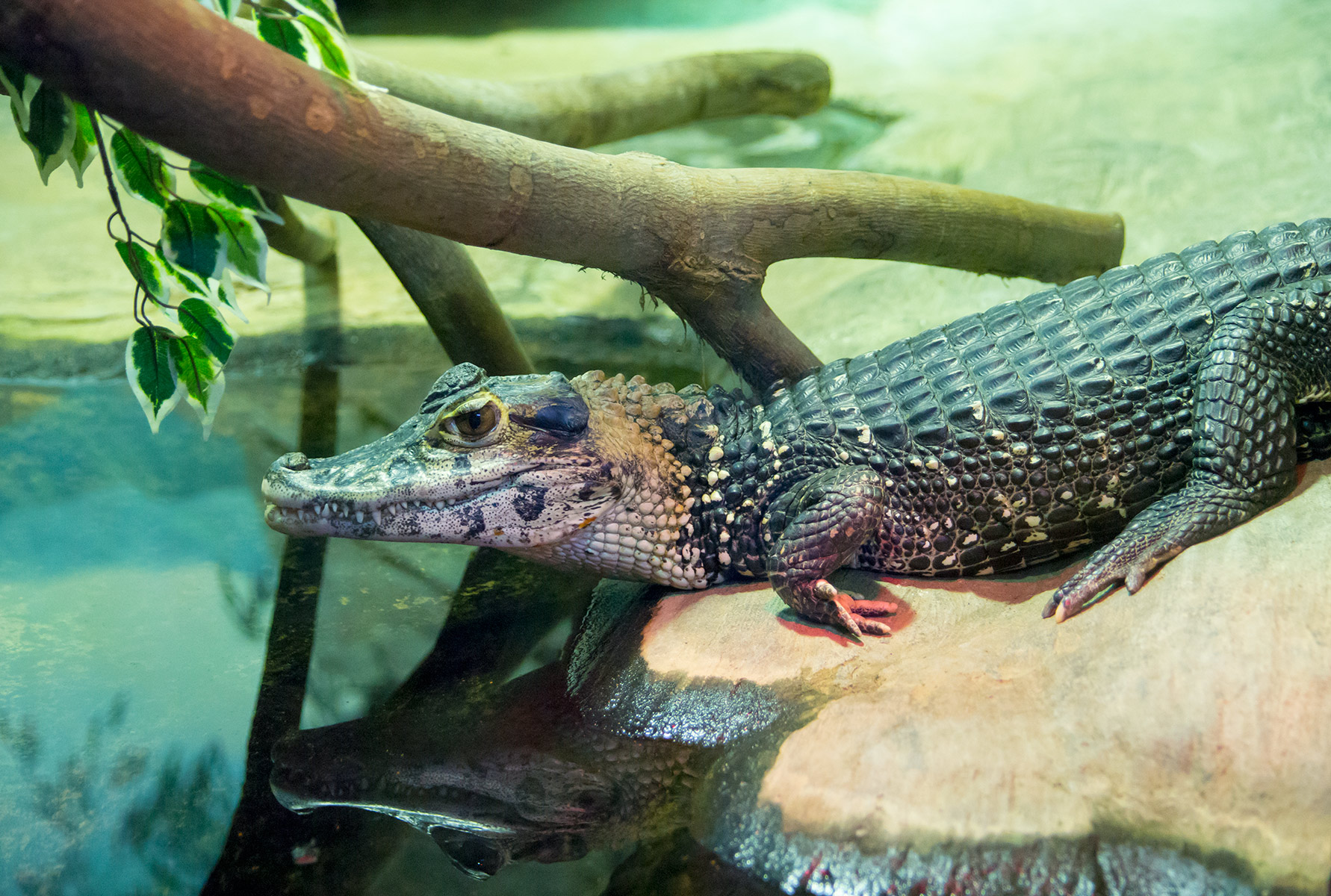
- Adult above, juvenile below at Moscow Zoo

Conservation status
- Least Concern (IUCN 3.1)
- CITES Appendix I (Note: Except the populations of Brazil and Ecuador which are included in Appendix II.)

Scientific classification
- Kingdom: Animalia
- Phylum: Chordata
- Class: Reptilia
- Order: Crocodylia
- Family: Alligatoridae
- Subfamily: Caimaninae
- Clade: Jacarea
- Genus: Melanosuchus
- Species: M. niger

Binomial name
- Melanosuchus niger (Spix, 1825)
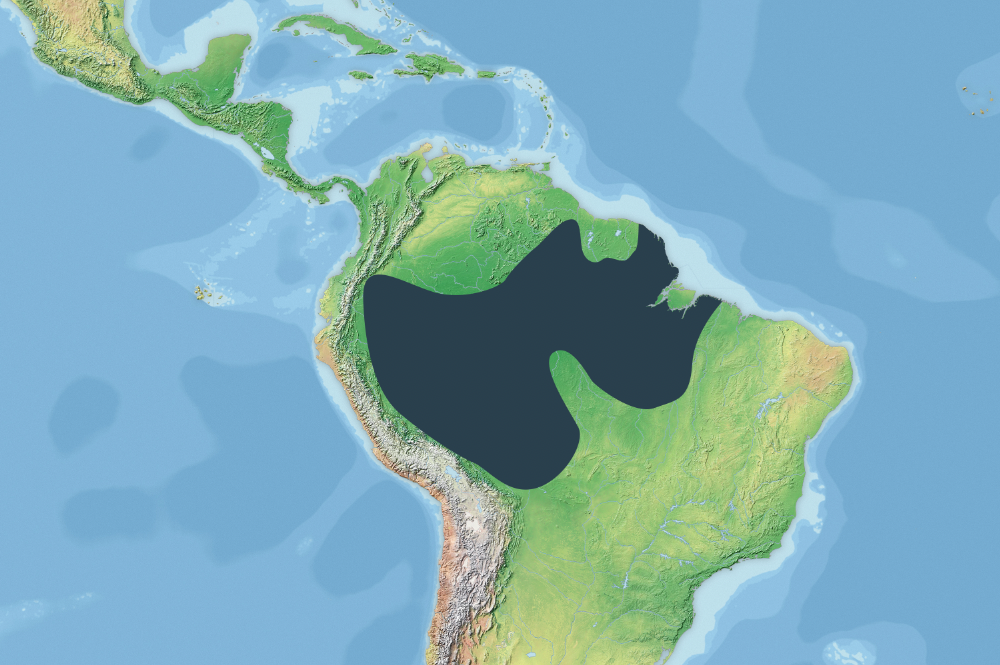

Synonyms
- List: Caiman niger Spix, 1825; Champsa nigra — Wagler, 1830; Jacare niger — Gray, 1844; Alligator niger — Strauch, 1866; Jacaretinga niger — Vaillant, 1898; Melanosuchus niger — King & Burke, 1989

= Black caiman =

Black caiman Temporal range: Present, 0.1–0 Ma

Largest extant species of caiman

The black caiman (Melanosuchus niger) is a crocodilian reptile endemic to South America. With a maximum length of around 5 to 6.5 m (16 to 21 ft) and a mass of over 450 kg (1,000 lb), it is the largest living species of the family Alligatoridae, and the third-largest crocodilian in the Neotropical realm. True to its common and scientific names, the black caiman has a dark greenish-black coloration as an adult. In some individuals, the pigmentation can appear almost jet-black. It has grey to brown banding on the lower jaw; juveniles have a more vibrant coloration compared to adults, with prominent white-pale yellow banding on the flanks that remains present well into adulthood (more than most other species). The banding on young helps with camouflage by breaking up their body outline, on land or in water, in an effort to avoid predation. The morphology is quite different from other caimans but the bony ridge that occurs in other caimans is present. The head is large and heavy, an advantage in catching larger prey. Like all crocodilians, caimans are long, squat creatures, with big jaws, long tails and short legs. They have thick, scaled skin, and their eyes and noses are located on the tops of their heads. This enables them to see and breathe while the rest of their body is underwater.

A carnivorous animal, the black caiman lives along freshwater habitats, including slow-moving rivers, lakes and seasonally flooded savannas, where it preys upon a variety of fish, reptiles, birds, and mammals. Being an apex predator and potentially a keystone species, it is a generalist, capable of taking most animals within its range, and might play a critical role in maintaining the structure of the ecosystem. Although only a few specific ecological studies have been conducted on black caimans, it is observed that this species has its own niche, which allows coexistence with other competitors.

Reproduction takes place in the dry season. Females build a nest mound with an egg chamber, protecting the eggs from predators. Hatchlings form groups called pods, guarded by the presence of the female. These pods may contain individuals from other nests. Once common, it was hunted to near extinction primarily for its commercially valuable hide. It is now making a comeback, listed as Conservation Dependent. Overall a little-known species, it was not researched in any detail until the 1980s, when the leather trade had already taken its toll. It is a dangerous species to humans, and attacks have occurred.

== Classification ==
Although the black caiman is the sole extant (living) species of the genus Melanosuchus, two fossil species found in South America have been described: Melanosuchus fisheri in 1976, and Melanosuchus latrubessei in 2020, although the status of M. fisheri is in doubt. The black caiman is a member of the caiman subfamily Caimaninae, and is one of six living species of caiman. It is most closely related to the caimans of the genus Caiman, as shown in the cladogram below, based on molecular DNA-based phylogenetic studies:

- Alligatoridae
  - Caimaninae
    - - Paleosuchus palpebrosus Cuvier's dwarf caiman
      - Paleosuchus trigonatus Schneider's dwarf caiman
    - Jacarea
      - - - Caiman crocodilus Spectacled caiman
          - Caiman yacare Yacare caiman
        - Caiman latirostris Broad-snouted caiman
      - Melanosuchus niger Black caiman
  - Alligatorinae
    - Alligator sinensis Chinese alligator
    - Alligator mississippiensis American alligator

== Distribution ==
The black caiman largely inhabits areas of Amazonia, living in rivers, swamps, wetlands, and lakes. It is found in Brazil, eastern Ecuador and Peru, northern Bolivia, eastern French Guiana, and southern Guyana.

== Characteristics ==
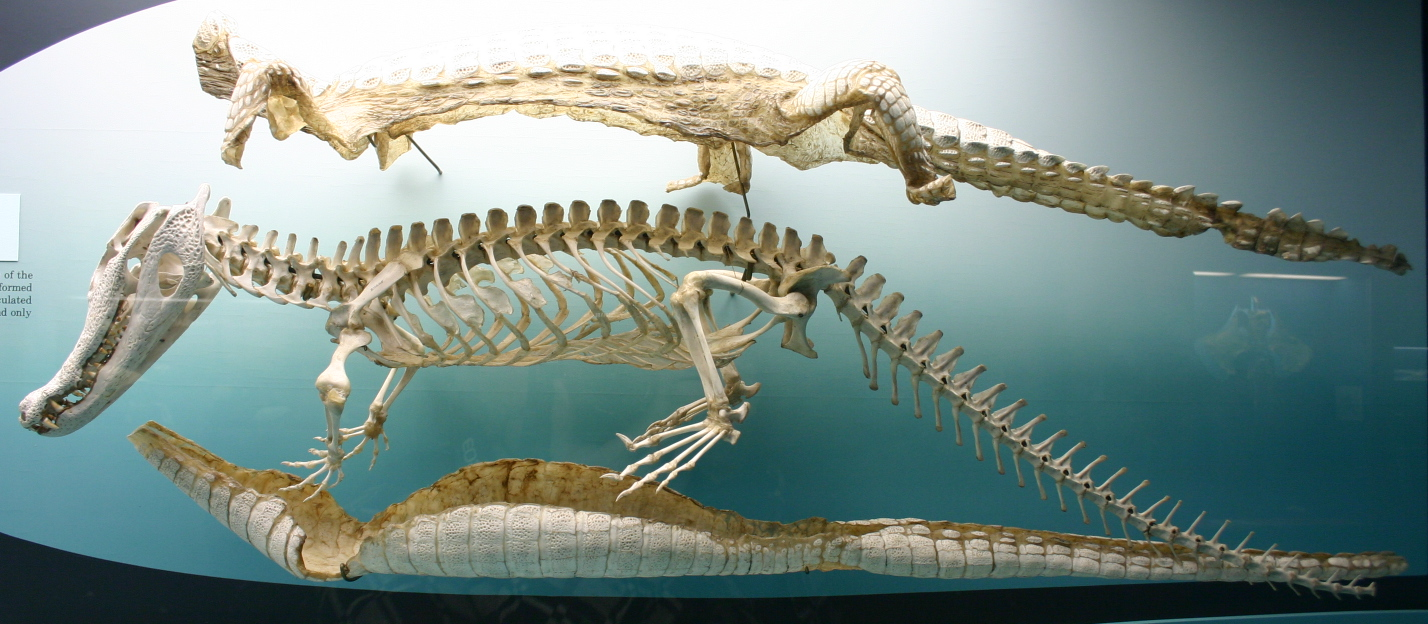
Epidermal body armour and skeleton of a young black caiman

The black caiman has dark-coloured, scaly skin. The skin coloration helps with camouflage during its nocturnal hunts, but may also help absorb heat (see thermoregulation). The lower jaw has grey banding (brown in older animals), and pale yellow or white bands are present across the flanks of the body, although these are much more prominent in juveniles. This banding fades only gradually as the animal matures. The bony ridge extending from above the eyes down the snout, as seen in other caiman, is present. The eyes are large, as befits its largely nocturnal activity, and brown in colour. Mothers on guard near their nests are tormented by blood-sucking flies that gather around their vulnerable eyes, leaving them bloodshot.

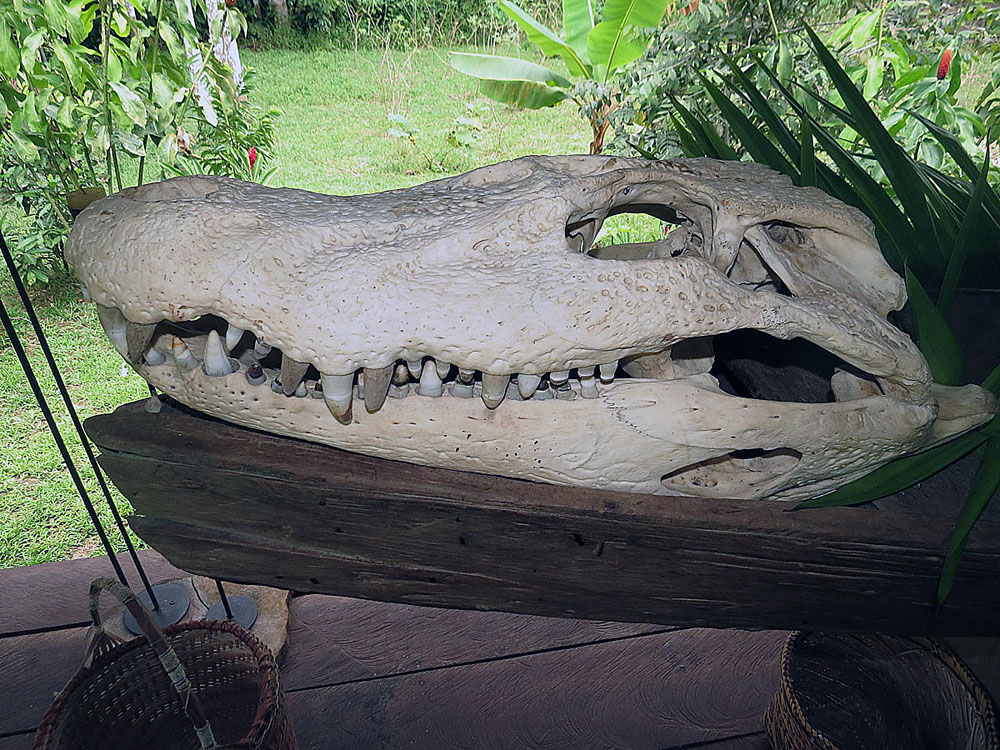
A black caiman skull from a large adult.

The black caiman is structurally dissimilar to other caiman species, particularly in the shape of the skull. Compared to other caimans, it has distinctly larger eyes. The snout is relatively deep, and the skull (given the species' considerably larger size) is much larger overall than other caimans. Black caimans are relatively more robust than other crocodilians of comparable length. There appears to be varying skull morphology in this species depending on the age and particular individual animal, which is not uncommon in other modern crocodilians, and by gender, with adult males typically having much more massive skulls relative to their size than like-age females. Due to the differences, males have a stronger bite force and likely exploit a different, and larger, prey base than females. Young black caimans can be distinguished from large spectacled caimans by their proportionately larger head, as well as by the colour of the jaw, which is light coloured in the spectacled caiman and dark with three black spots in the black caiman. A 3-metre (10 ft), 103-kilogram (227 lb) black caiman was found to have a bite force of 4,310 N (970 lb_{f}).

=== Size ===
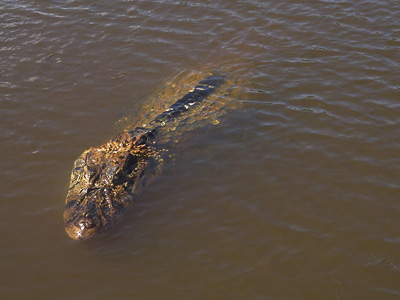
A swimming black caiman.

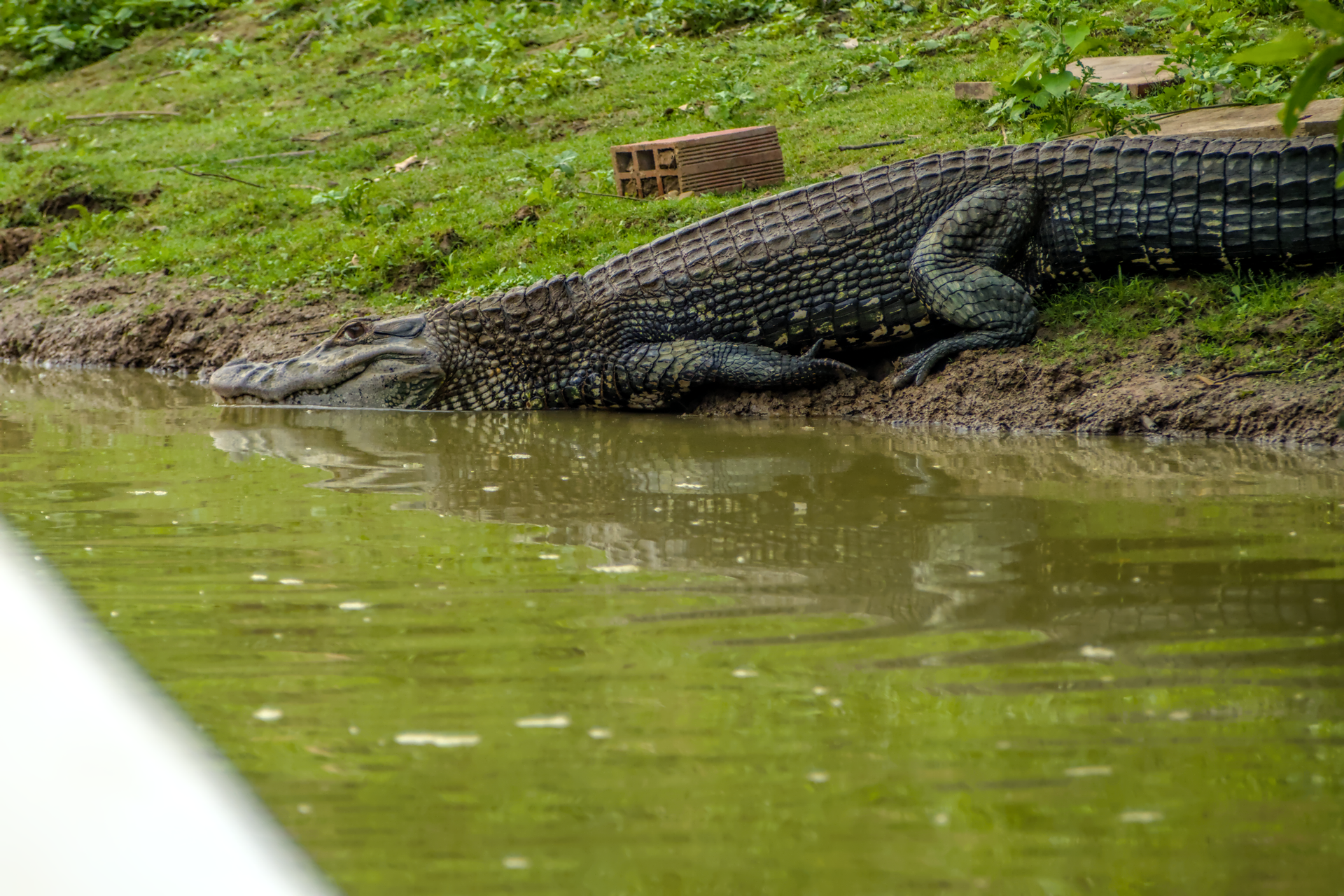
In Bolivia

The black caiman is the largest predator in the Amazon basin and the largest member of the Alligatoridae family, making it one of the largest extant reptiles. It is also significantly larger than other caiman species. Most adult black caimans are 2.2 to 2.9 m (7 ft 3 in to 9 ft 6 in) in length, with a few old males exceeding 5 m (16 ft 5 in). Sub-adult male specimens of around 2.5 to 4 m (8 ft 2 in to 13 ft 1 in) will weigh roughly 95 to 125 kg (209 to 276 lb), around the same size as a mature female, but will quickly increase in bulk and weight. The average size of adult females at their nests was found to be 2.8 m (9 ft 2 in). Mid-sized mature males of 3.5 to 4 m (11 ft 6 in to 13 ft 1 in) weigh approximately 300 kg (660 lb), while large mature specimens exceed 400 to 500 kg (880 to 1,100 lb), being relatively bulky crocodilians. Very large, old males can exceed 5 m (16 ft 5 in) in length, and weigh up to 750 kg (1,650 lb). A relatively small adult male of a total length of 3.4 m (11 ft 2 in) weighed 98 kg (216 lb) while an adult male considered fairly large at a length of 4.2 m (13 ft 9 in) weighed approximately 350 kg (770 lb). Another sampling of sub-adult males found them to range in length from 2.1 to 2.8 m (6 ft 11 in to 9 ft 2 in), averaging 2.45 m (8 ft 0 in), and that they weighed from 26 to 86 kg (57 to 190 lb), averaging 48 kg (106 lb). In a study conducted in Rupununi River, Guyana, sub-adult and adult black caimans ranged from 2.03 to 3.71 m (6 ft 8 in to 12 ft 2 in) in length and weighed between 18 and 210 kg (40 and 463 lb). In some areas (such as the Araguaia River) this species is consistently reported at 4 to 5 m (13 ft 1 in – 16 ft 5 in) in length, although specimens this size are uncommon. Several widely reported but unconfirmed (and probably largely anecdotal) reports claim that the black caiman can grow to over 6.1 m (20 ft 0 in) in length and weigh up to 1,100 kg (2,400 lb). While it is unclear what the sources for this maximum size are, many scientific papers accept that this species can attain extreme sizes as such. In South America, two other crocodilians reportedly reach similar sizes: the American crocodile (Crocodylus acutus) and the Orinoco crocodile (C. intermedius).

== Biology and behaviour ==
=== Hunting and diet ===
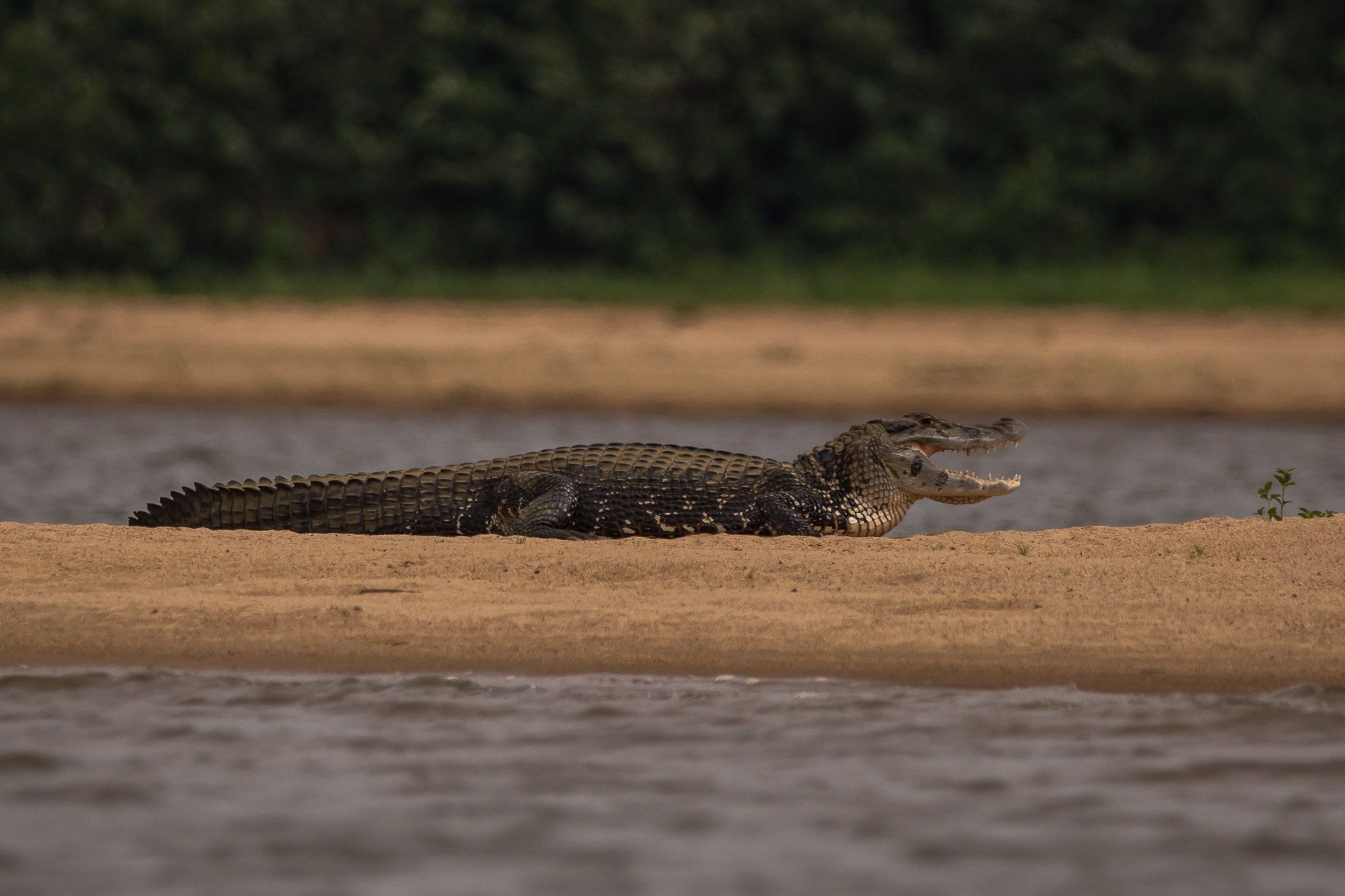
In Rio Guaporé

Black caimans are apex predators with a generalist diet, and can take virtually any terrestrial and riparian animal found throughout their range. Similar to other large crocodilians, black caimans have even been observed catching and eating smaller species, such as the spectacled caiman and sometimes cannibalizing smaller individuals of their own kind. Hatchlings mostly eat small fish, frogs, and invertebrates such as molluscs, crustaceans, arachnids, and insects, but with time and size graduate to eating larger fish, including piranhas, catfish, and perch, as well as molluscs, which remain a significant food source for all black caimans. Dietary studies have focused on young caimans (due both to their often being more common than large adults and to their being easier to handle), the largest specimen examined for stomach contents in one study being only 1.54 m (5 ft 1 in) notably under sexually mature size, which is at a minimum 2 m (6 ft 7 in) in smaller females. Although diverse prey is known to be captured by young black caimans, dietary studies have shown snails often dominate the diet of young caiman, followed by quite small fish. Fish were the main prey of black caimans of over subadult size in Manú National Park, Peru. Various prey will be taken by availability, includes snakes, turtles, birds and mammals, the latter two mainly when they come to drink at the river banks. Mammalian prey mostly include common Amazonian species such as various monkeys, sloths, armadillos, pacas, porcupines, agoutis, coatis, and capybaras Large prey can include other species of caimans, deer, peccaries, tapirs, anacondas, giant otters, Amazon river dolphins and domestic animals including pigs, cattle, horses, and dogs. Although rare predations on cougars or even jaguars have been reported, very little evidence exists of such predation, and cats are likely to avoid ponds with large adult black caimans, suggesting that adults of this species are higher in the food chain than even the jaguar. Where capybara and white-lipped peccary herds are common, they are reportedly among the most common prey item for large adults. Evidence has suggested fairly large river turtles can be counted among the prey of adult black caimans, the bite force of which is apparently sufficient to shatter a turtle shell. Large males have even been observed to cannibalize other Black Caimans. Compared to the smaller caiman species, the black caiman more often hunts terrestrially at night, using its acute hearing and sight. As with all crocodilian species, their teeth are designed to grab but not chew, so they generally try to swallow their food whole after drowning or crushing it. Large prey that cannot be swallowed whole are often stored so that the flesh will rot enough to allow the caiman to take bites out of the flesh.

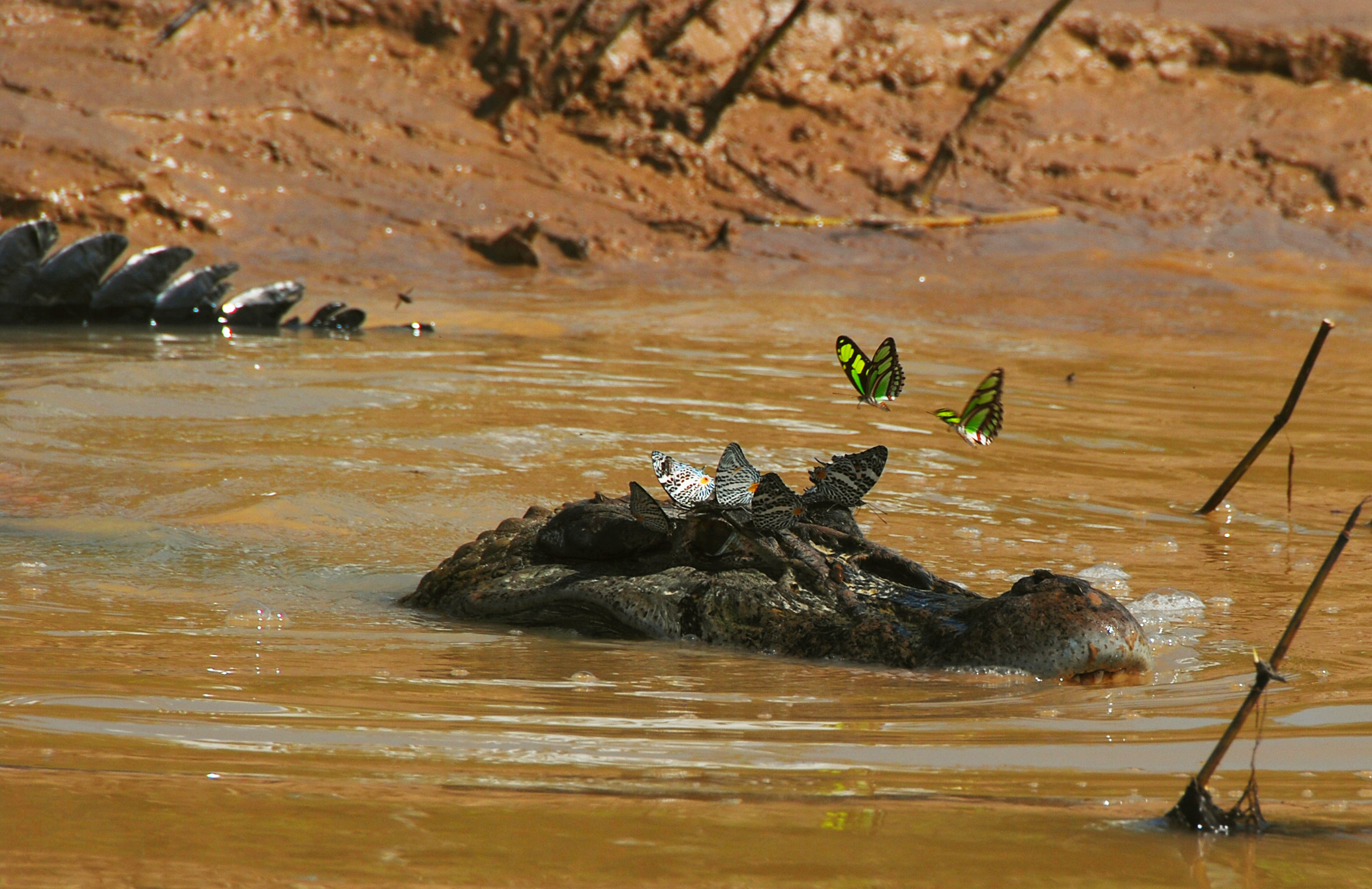
Adult

=== Reproduction ===
At the end of the dry season, females build a nest of soil and vegetation, which is about 1.5 m (4.9 ft) across and 0.75 m (2.5 ft) wide. They lay up to 65 eggs (though usually somewhere between 30 and 60), which hatch in about six weeks, at the beginning of the wet season, when newly flooded marshes provide ideal habitat for the juveniles once hatched. The eggs are quite large, averaging 144 g (5.1 oz) in weight. Unguarded clutches (when the mother goes off to hunt) are readily devoured by a wide array of animals, regularly including mammals such as South American coatis (Nasua nasua) or large rodents, egg-preying snakes and birds such as herons and vultures. Occasionally predators are caught and killed by the mother caiman. Hatching is said to occur between 42 and 90 days after the eggs are laid. It is well documented that, as with other crocodilians, caimans frequently move their young from the nest in their mouths after hatching (whence the erroneous belief that they eat their young), and transport them to a safe pool. The mother will assist chirping, unhatched young to break out of the leathery eggs, by delicately breaking the eggs between her teeth. She will try to look after her young for several months but the baby caimans are largely independent and most do not survive to maturity. Baby black caimans are subject to predation even more regularly after they hatch, facing many of the same mesopredators, as well any other crocodilian (including those of their own species), large snake or large, carnivorous fish that they encounter. Predation is so common that black caimans count on their young to survive via safety in numbers. The female black caiman only breeds once every 2 to 3 years, and doesn't become sexually mature until 20 years of age. During the dry season throughout the Black Caimans reproduction season, they will give off a sound that closely resembles like rumbling thunder in order to communicate with others.

=== Interspecific predatory relationships ===
Many predators, including various fish, mammal, reptile and even amphibian species, feed on caiman eggs and hatchlings. The black caiman shares its habitat with at least 3 other semi-amphibious animals considered apex predators, usually able to co-exist with them by focusing on different prey and micro-habitats. These are giant otters which are social and are obligate aquatic foragers and piscivorans, green anacondas which are predators of other caiman species, alongside sizeable individuals of this caiman (albeit not regularly), and jaguars, which are the most terrestrial of these and focus their diet mainly on relatively larger mammals and terrestrial reptiles. Black caimans eat more or less all the same prey as the other species. They are possibly the most opportunistic but, despite being the largest predator of the area, can metabolically live off their food longer and thus may not need to hunt as frequently. Usually, each predator avoids encounters with adults of the others but battles, which can be lost by nearly any side, may rarely occur. Green anaconda, jaguars and black caiman arguably sit atop this food chain. Once the black caiman attains a length of a few feet, it has few natural predators. The jaguar (Panthera onca), being a known predator of all other caiman species, is another primary predatory threat to juvenile and subadult black caimans, with several records of predation on young black caimans and eggs. However, adult black caimans have no natural predators, as is true of other similarly-sized crocodilian species given the size, weight, bite force, thick hide, and immense strength. Even though females and smaller individuals may be preyed on by jaguars, larger males may themselves prey upon jaguars in exceptional cases.

== Conservation status and threats ==
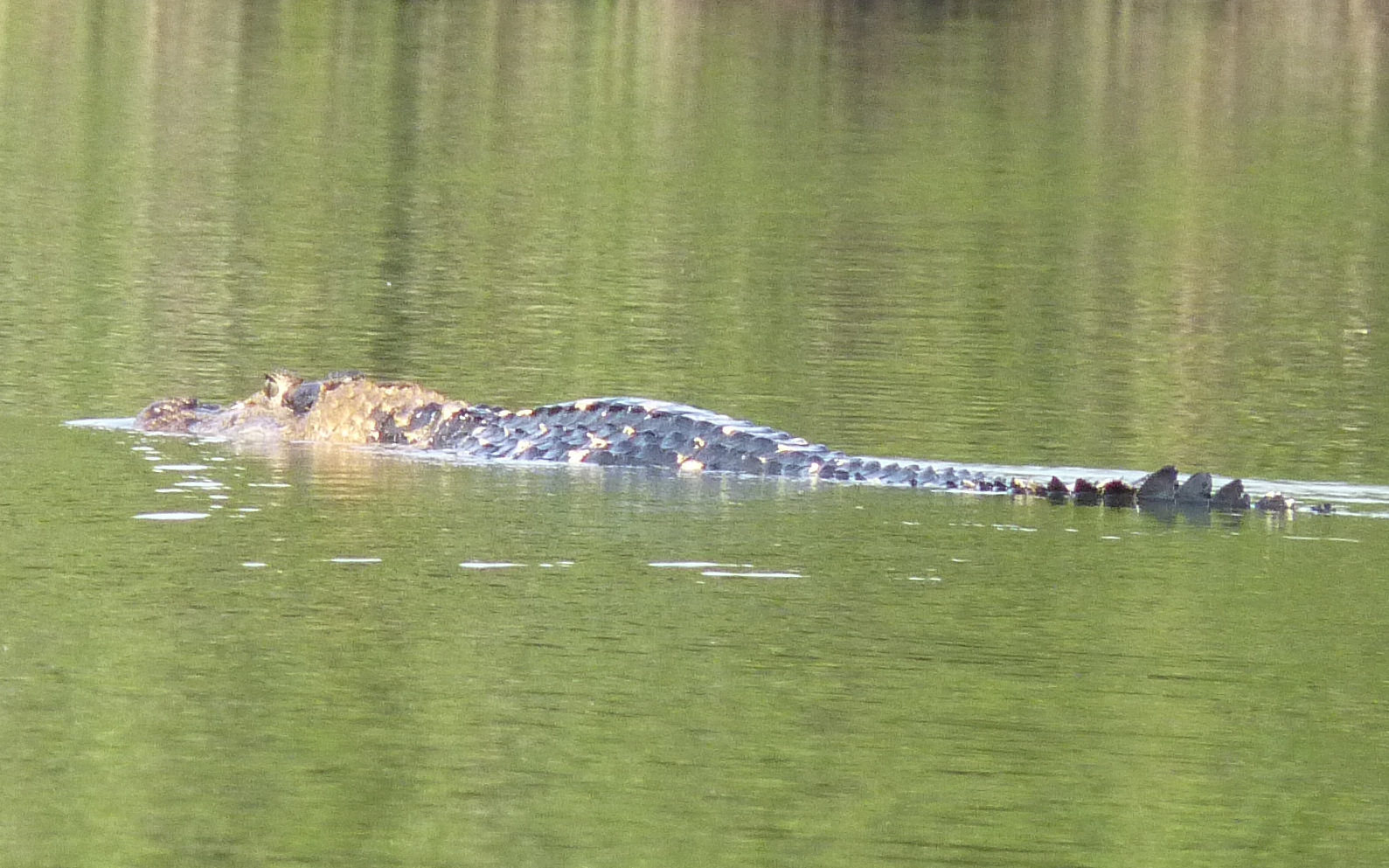
A swimming black caiman.

Humans hunt black caimans for leather or meat. This species was classified as Endangered in the 1970s due to the high demand for its well-marked skin. The trade in black caiman leather peaked from the 1950s to 1970s, when the smaller but much more common spectacled caiman (Caiman crocodilus) became the more commonly hunted species. Local people still trade black caiman skins and meat today at a small scale but the species has rebounded overall from the overhunting in the past. That black caimans lay, on average, around 40 eggs has helped them recover to some degree. A possible equal ongoing threat is habitat destruction, since development and clear-cutting is now epidemic in South America. Spectacled caimans have now filled the niche of crocodilian predator of fish in many areas. Due to their greater numbers and faster reproductive abilities, the Spectacled populations are locally outcompeting black caimans, although the larger species dominates in a one-on-one basis. Persistent management is needed to control caiman-hunting and is quite difficult to enforce effectively. After the depletion of the black caiman population, piranhas and capybaras, having lost perhaps their primary predator, reached unnaturally high numbers. This has, in turn, led to increased agricultural and livestock losses.

Compounding the conservation issues it faces, this species occasionally preys on humans. Most tales are poorly documented and unconfirmed but, given this species' formidable size and strength, attacks on humans are quite often fatal.

The species is uncommon in captivity and breeding it has proven to be a challenge. The first captive breeding outside its native range was at Aalborg Zoo in 2013.

As of 2025, the IUCN downgraded the Black Caiman from Conservation Dependent to Least Concern.

== See also ==
- List of largest reptiles
