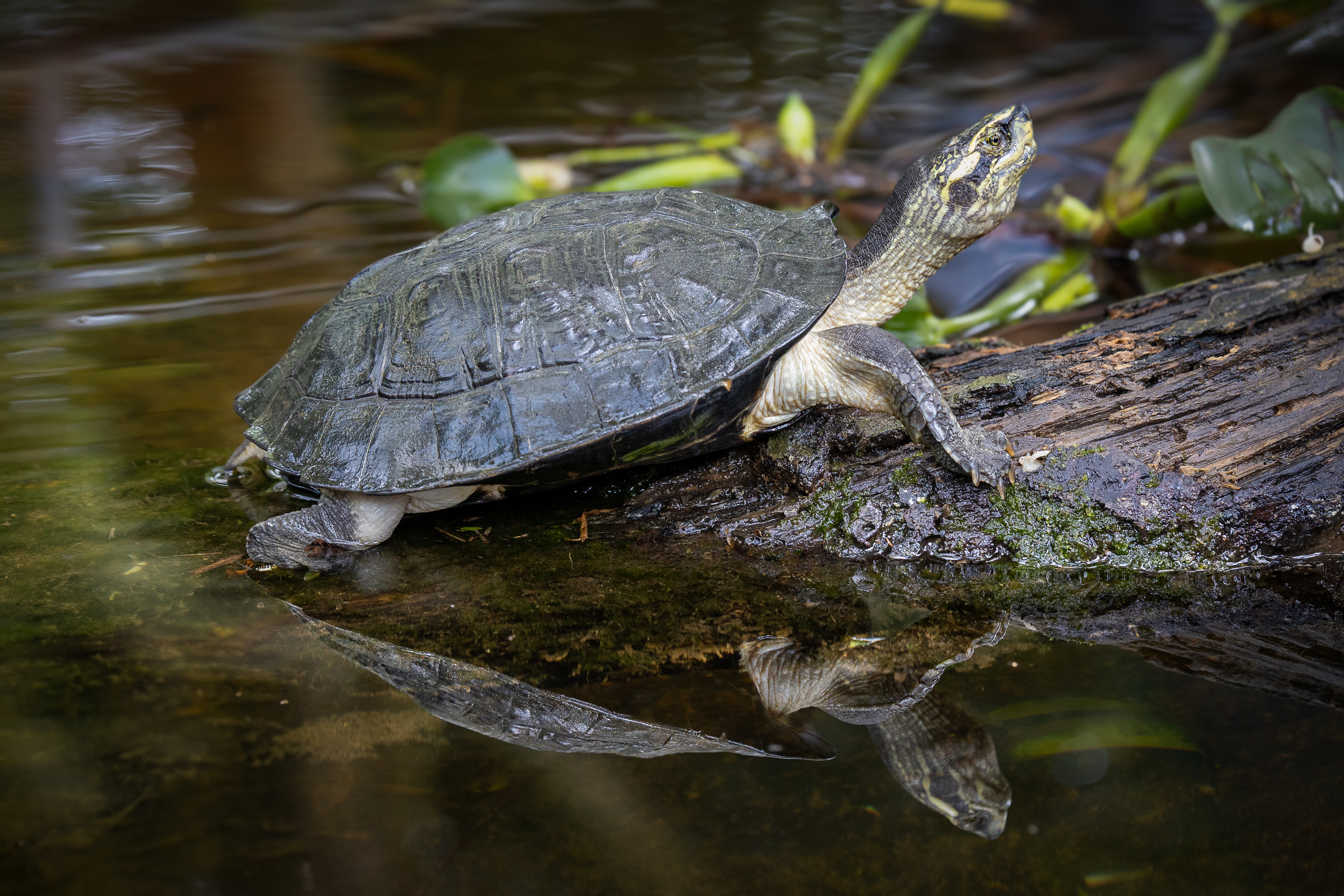
- Yellow-headed temple turtle in Turtle Conservation Center, Cuc-Phuong, Vietnam

Conservation status
- Critically Endangered (IUCN 3.1)
- CITES Appendix II

Scientific classification
- Kingdom: Animalia
- Phylum: Chordata
- Class: Reptilia
- Order: Testudines
- Suborder: Cryptodira
- Family: Geoemydidae
- Genus: Heosemys
- Species: H. annandalii

Binomial name
- Heosemys annandalii (Boulenger, 1903)

Synonyms
- Cyclemys annandalii Boulenger, 1903; Hieremys annandalei M.A. Smith, 1916 (ex errore); Cyclemys annandali Mell, 1929 (ex errore); Cyclemys annandalei M.A. Smith, 1930; Hieremys annandalii M.A. Smith, 1930; Hieremys annandali Mertens, L. Müller & Rust, 1934; Heosemys annandalii Diesmos, Parham, B.L. Stuart & R.M. Brown, 2005

= Yellow-headed temple turtle =

Species of turtle

The yellow-headed temple turtle (Heosemys annandalii) is a large species of turtle in the family Geoemydidae. The species is native to South Asia and Southeast Asia.

== Systematics ==
The species was first described in 1903 by George Albert Boulenger, who placed the species in the genus Cyclemys, the Asian leaf turtles. The type locality is Yala, Yala Province, Thailand. (Note: Given as "Kampong Jalor" by Boulenger.) The specific name annandalii is an eponym honoring naturalist Nelson Annandale, founder of the Zoological Survey of India.

The genus Hieremys was erected for the species in 1916 by Malcolm Arthur Smith, and would remain monotypic up until its synonymization with Heosemys. (Note: Smith in error designated the type species of the genus as Hieremys annandalei rather than Hierermys annandalii.) The name was derived from the Greek hieros 'sacred, holy' and emys 'turtle', in reference to annandalii being revered as a sacred animal and often kept in temple ponds in the region it is native to.

- Heosemys
  - H. spinosa
  - - H. annandalii
    - - H. depressa
      - H. grandis

Cladogram showing the internal phylogeny of Heosemys.

In 2004, Spinks et al. suggested that annandalii might belong in Heosemys, but refrained from moving it pending more evidence. The move came in 2005, in the wake of the rediscovery of Siebenrockiella leytensis – at the time placed in Heosemys – in Palawan after decades without any confirmed sightings. A molecular phylogenetics study by Arvin Diesmos, James Parham, Bryan Stuart and Rafe Marion Brown found that the species was not actually related to the other members of Heosemys, but they also viewed the results as being sufficient evidence that annandalii was part of the Heosemys clade for the move to the genus to go ahead. Later results showed that Heosemys is paraphyletic if H. annandalii is not included.

== Description ==
H. annandalii is a large turtle, with mature individuals having dark-brown or black elongated carapaces that are known to reach lengths of up to 50 cm (20 in) in males and 42 cm (17 in) in females. The plastron and bridge are well-developed and share a , with the bridge featuring large axillary and inguinal scutes, although the plastron is shorter than the carapace and lacks a hinge. The plastron and bridge share a yellow base colour and have large black blotches on their scutes, which often expand and grow together as the turtle gets older, which can eventually result in the whole plastron becoming black. The plastron is concave in males.

The head is blackish to olive, with grey markings and series of yellow or cream stripes. The stripes fade with age, disappearing completely in some older individuals. The chin and throat are cream to white, and features dark flecks in some individuals.

The forelimbs are grey, usually of a darker shade further up and a lighter one further down, and are covered in scales. All toes feature heavy webbing. The tail is short and grey, and thicker in males than in females.

The species' karyotype is 2n = 52.

== Geographic range ==
H. annandalii is found in Cambodia, Laos, Malaysia, Thailand, Vietnam, and possibly Myanmar.

== Habitat ==
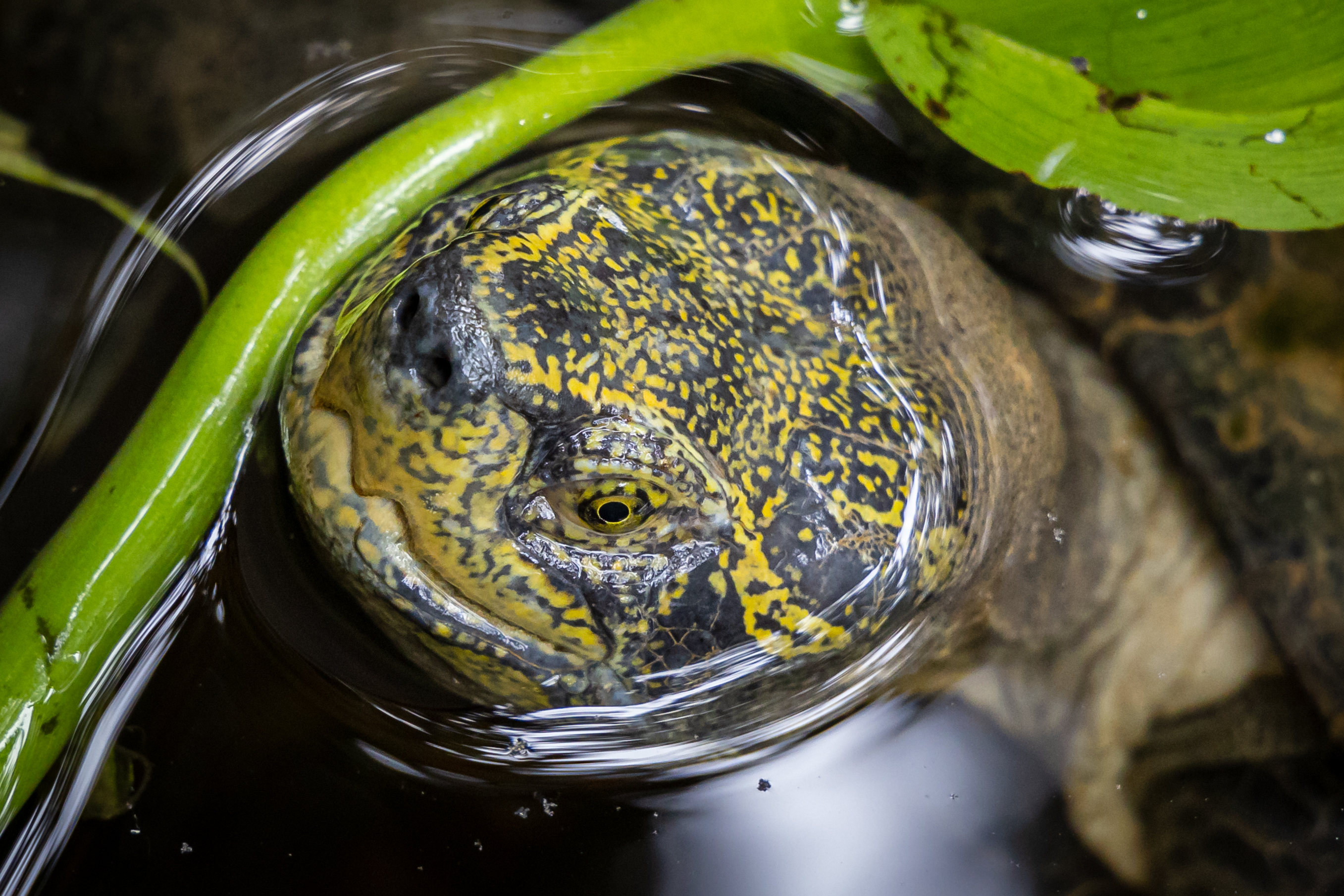
Heosemys annandalii in Cuc Phuong Turtle Conservation Center, Vietnam

The preferred natural habitats of H. annandalii are wet forests and freshwater wetlands.

== Captivity ==
H. annandalii may live in captivity for up to 35 years.

Two turtles were hatched in November 2019 at the Columbus Zoo and Aquarium. Heosemys annadali has been breed in captivity.

== Parasites ==
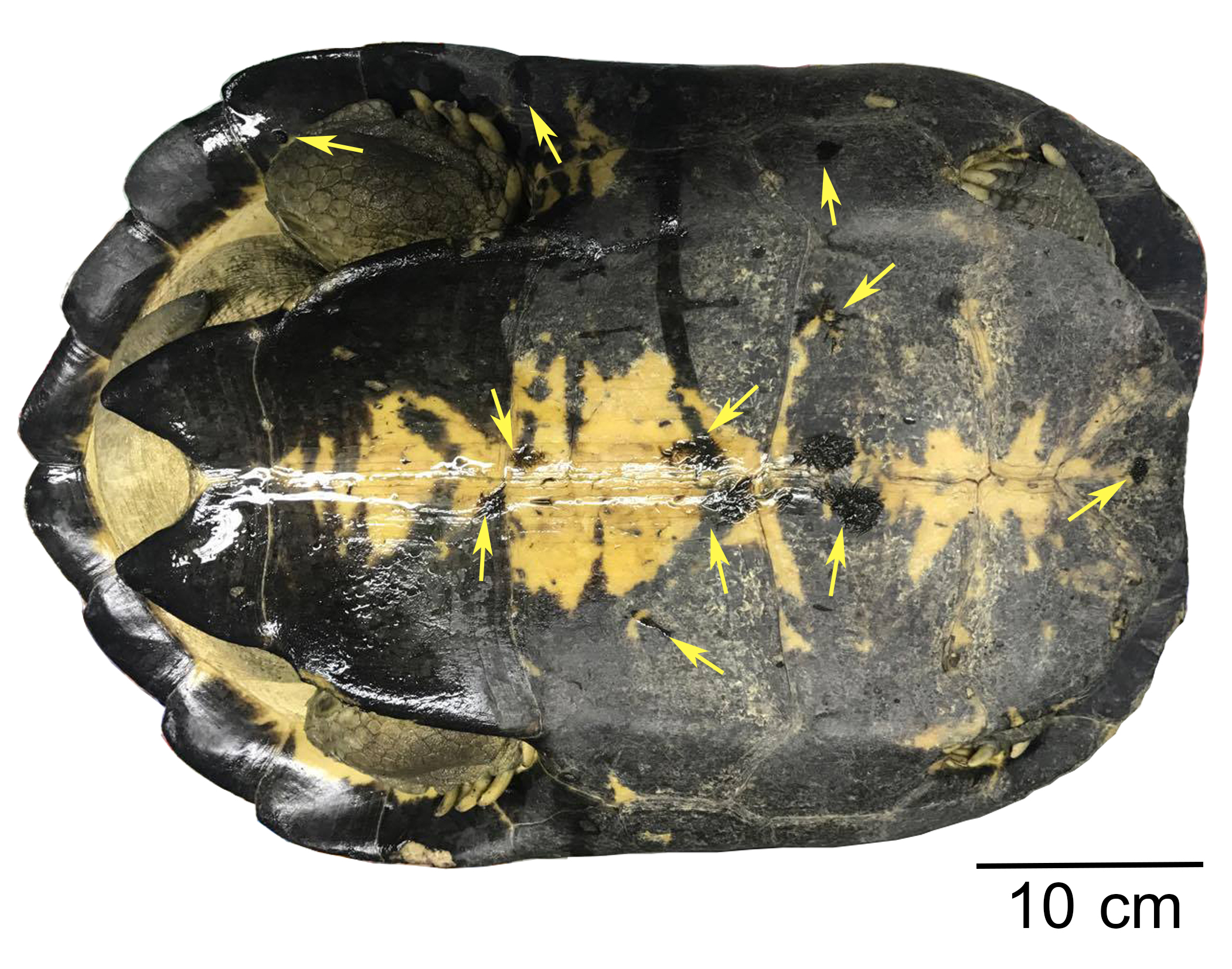
Leeches, Placobdelloides siamensis on the carapace of a yellow-headed temple turtle (arrows)

The leech Placobdelloides siamensis is an ectoparasite of this turtle.

== Conservation status ==
The Convention on International Trade in Endangered Species of Wild Fauna and Flora (CITES) suspended trade of yellow-headed temple turtles in July 2012.
