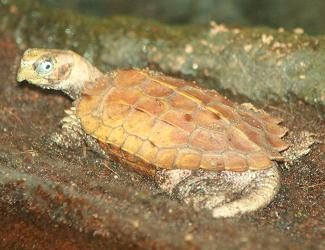
- G. spengleri

Scientific classification
- Kingdom: Animalia
- Phylum: Chordata
- Class: Reptilia
- Order: Testudines
- Suborder: Cryptodira
- Family: Geoemydidae
- Subfamily: Geoemydinae
- Genus: Geoemyda; Gray, 1834

= Geoemyda =

Genus of turtles

Geoemyda is a genus of freshwater turtles in the family Geoemydidae (formerly Bataguridae). It contains two species:

- Ryukyu black-breasted leaf turtle, Geoemyda japonica
- Black-breasted leaf turtle, Geoemyda spengleri

Geoemyda was used as a "wastebin taxon" in former times, uniting a number of distinct lineages of forest turtles from East and Southeast Asia. These are now regarded as distinct and placed in the genera Heosemys, Leucocephalon, Melanochelys, Siebenrockiella (including Panayanemys), and Vijayachelys.
