= Temple turtle =

Temple turtle may refer to:

- Yellow-headed temple turtle (Heosemys annandalii), a Southeast Asian geoemydid turtle species often kept in Buddhist temples.
- Black marsh turtle (Siebenrockiella crassicollis), a Southeast Asian geoemydid turtle species also known as the Siamese temple turtle and kept in Buddhist temples.
