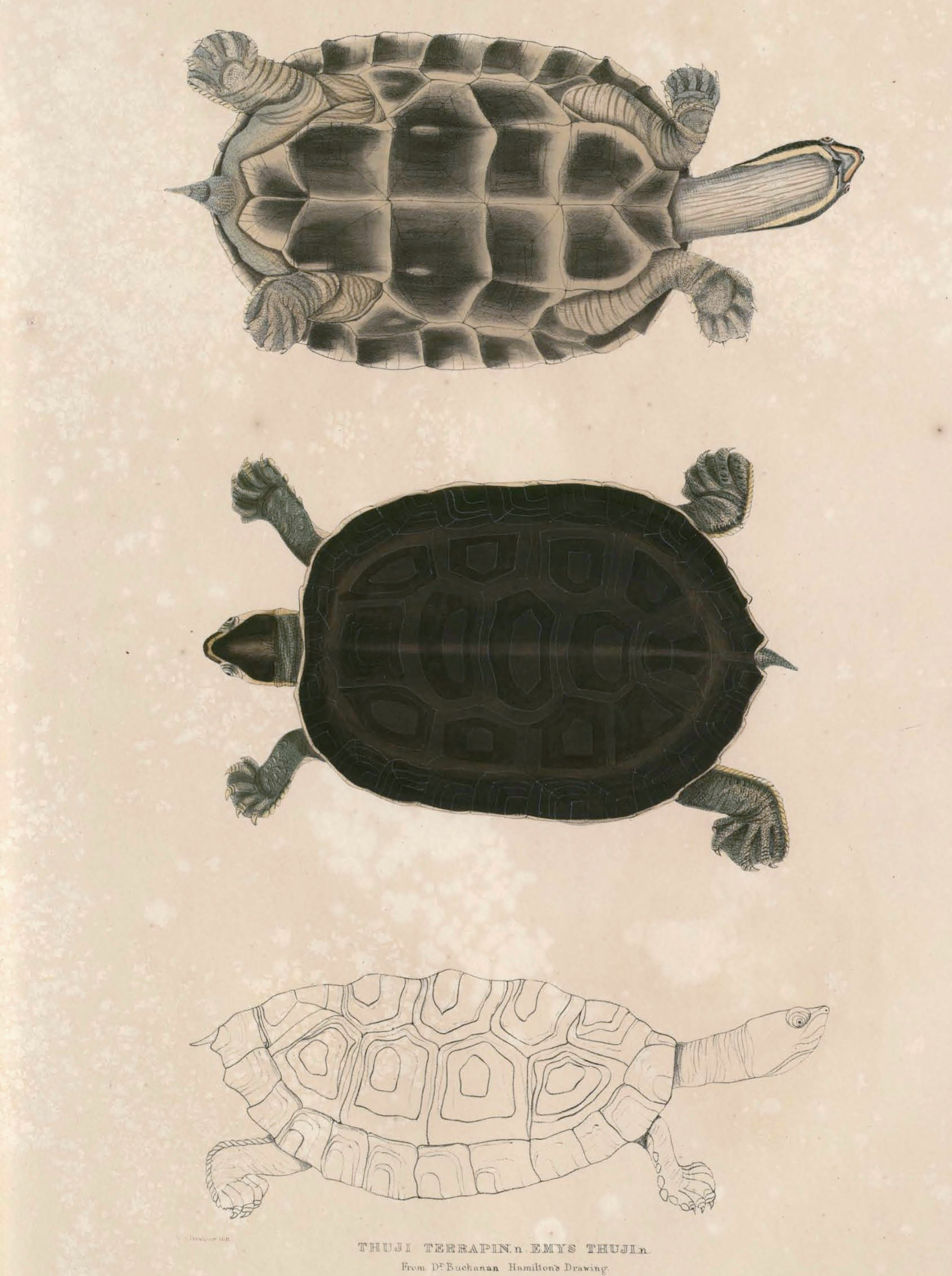
- Hardella thurjii

Conservation status
- Endangered (IUCN 3.1)
- CITES Appendix II

Scientific classification
- Kingdom: Animalia
- Phylum: Chordata
- Class: Reptilia
- Order: Testudines
- Suborder: Cryptodira
- Family: Geoemydidae
- Subfamily: Geoemydinae
- Genus: Hardella; Gray, 1870
- Species: H. thurjii

Binomial name
- Hardella thurjii (Gray, 1831)

Synonyms
- Hardella thurjii thurjii (Gray, 1831): Emys thuryi Gray in Griffith & Pidgeon, 1831 (nomen oblitum); Emys thurjii Gray, 1831; Emys thuji Gray, 1831 (ex errore); Emys flavonigra Lesson, 1831; Emys thugi Gray, 1832 (ex errore); Clemmys (Clemmys) thurgii Fitzinger, 1835 (ex errore); Emys thurgii — Gray, 1844; Clemmys thurgi Strauch, 1862 (ex errore); Batagur thurgii — Theobald, 1868; Kachuga oldhami Gray, 1869; Hardella thurgi — Gray, 1870; Emys thurgi — Günther, 1871; Batagur (Hardella) thurgi — Anderson, 1879; ? Batagur cautleyi Lydekker, 1885; ? Batagur falconeri Lydekker, 1885; Hardella thurgii — Siebenrock, 1906; Hardella thurjii — Siebenrock, 1909; Hardella thurjii thurjii — Wermuth & Mertens, 1977; Hardella thurji Pritchard, 1979 (ex errore); Hardella thurji thurji — Obst, 1985; Hardella thurjii indi Gray, 1870: Hardella indi Gray, 1870; Hardella thurjii indi — Wermuth & Mertens, 1977; Hardella thurji indi — Obst, 1984; Hardella thrrji indi Gosławski & Hryniewicz, 1993 (ex errore)

= Brahminy river turtle =

Species of turtle

The brahminy river turtle or crowned river turtle (Hardella thurjii) is a species of turtle in the family Geoemydidae. The species is endemic to South Asia.

== Taxonomy ==
The genus Hardella, to which the species Hardella thurjii belongs, is a monotypic genus.

== Geographic range ==
Hardella thurjii is found in northern India, Pakistan, and Bangladesh in the watersheds of the Ganges, Brahmaputra, and Indus rivers.

== Description ==
Hardella thurjii has a shell with a large, moderately flat, dark brown or black carapace (dorsal surface) and a yellow or black plastron (ventral surface). The shell is up to 18 inches (460 mm) in length in females, and is shorter in males. The lower jaw is heavily dented.

== Sexual dimorphism ==
Hardella thurjii exhibits sexual dimorphism. Mature females are three times the size of mature males. According to Das, maximum straight carapace length in females is 61 cm (24 in), but in males maximum straight carapace length is only 18 cm (7.1 in).

== Reproduction ==
The reproductive habits of H. thurjii are unique among reptiles in that the females lay their eggs under water rather than on dry land. Their reproductive cycle follows seasonal changes in the water levels of the rivers in which they live. In autumn, females lay their eggs under water, where higher water levels submerge the eggs for 40 to 45 days. In the winter, lower water levels expose the eggs for five months. The rising water levels of spring submerge the almost mature eggs once again, and the turtles hatch in the river.

Indian zoologist Dhruvajyoti Basu first documented the unique reproductive habits of the brahminy river turtle in 2011. The Prague Zoo incubated the first brahminy river turtle which was born in captivity in 2012.
