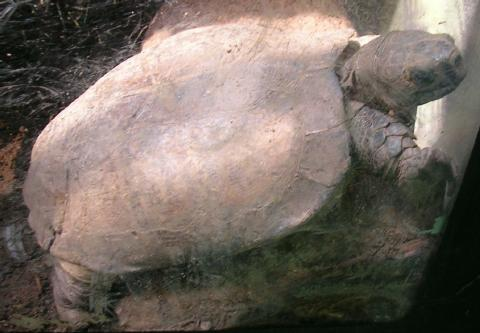
- Arakan forest turtle (Heosemys depressa)

Scientific classification
- Kingdom: Animalia
- Phylum: Chordata
- Class: Reptilia
- Order: Testudines
- Suborder: Cryptodira
- Family: Geoemydidae
- Subfamily: Geoemydinae
- Genus: Heosemys; Stejneger, 1902

Species
- See text

Synonyms
- Hieremys

= Heosemys =

Genus of turtles

Heosemys is a genus of freshwater turtles ("terrapins" in British English) in the family Geoemydidae (formerly called Bataguridae). The genus Heosemys was split out of the related genus Geoemyda by McDowell in 1964.

== Species ==
Four species are placed under Heosemys:

- Arakan forest turtle (Boulenger, 1903), Heosemys depressa
- Giant Asian pond turtle (Gray, 1860), Heosemys grandis
- Spiny turtle (Gray, 1831), Heosemys spinosa
- Yellow-headed temple turtle (Anderson, 1875), Heosemys annandalii

Some other species, initially placed here also, are now in different genera. The Sulawesi forest turtle is now classified under Leucocephalon, the Philippine forest turtle under Siebenrockiella, and the Cochin Forest cane turtle under Vijayachelys.
