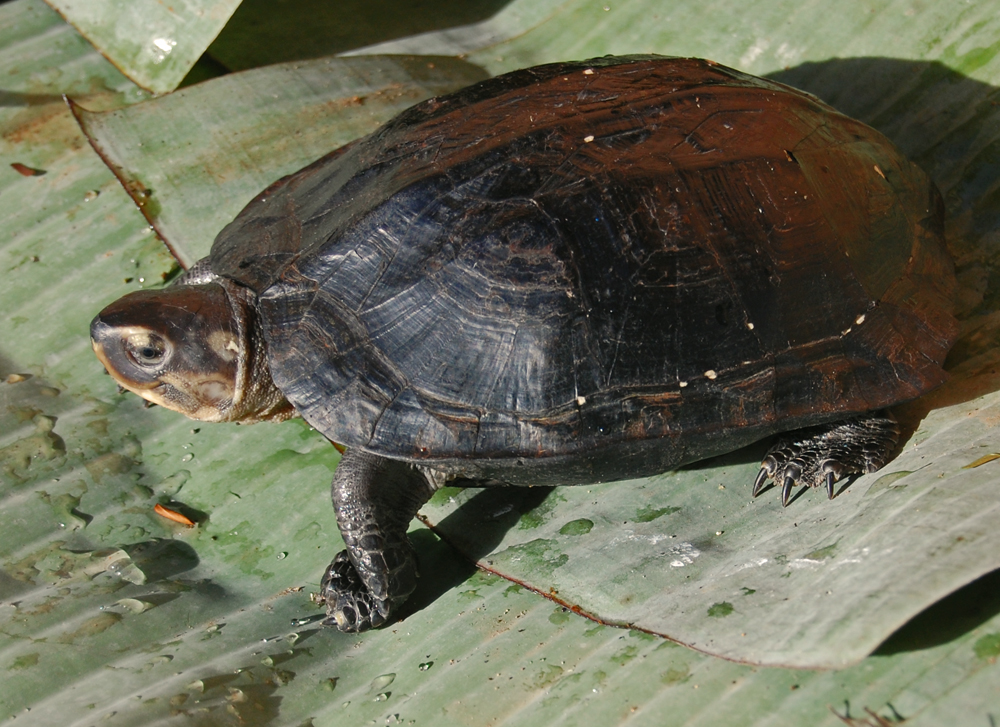
- Black marsh turtle regulating body temperature in the sunlight

Conservation status
- Endangered (IUCN 3.1)
- CITES Appendix II

Scientific classification
- Kingdom: Animalia
- Phylum: Chordata
- Class: Reptilia
- Order: Testudines
- Suborder: Cryptodira
- Family: Geoemydidae
- Genus: Siebenrockiella
- Species: S. crassicollis

Binomial name
- Siebenrockiella crassicollis (Gray, 1831)
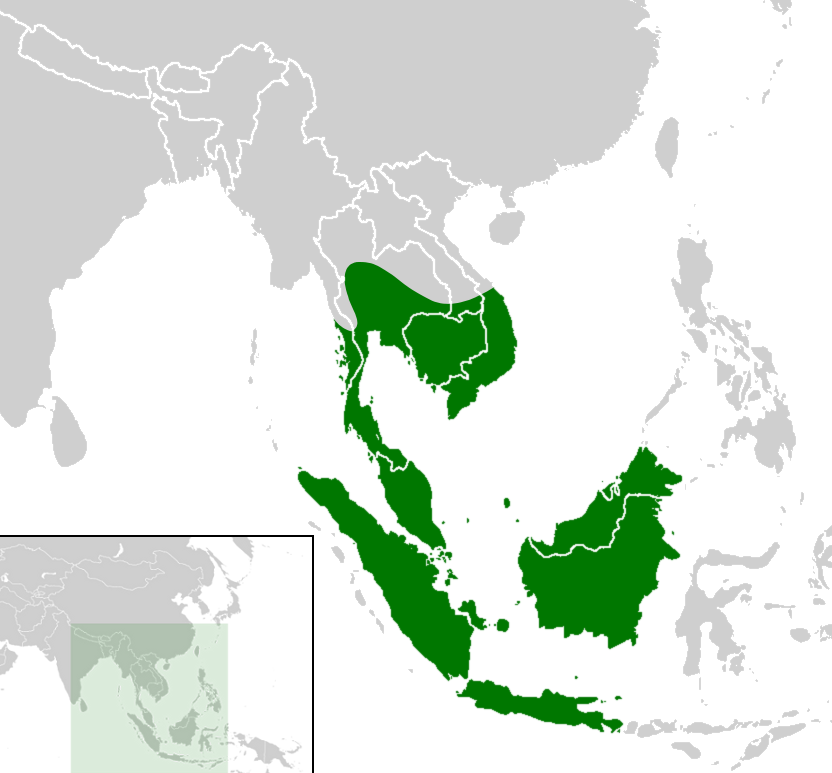
- Distribution of Siebenrockiella crassicollis.

Synonyms
- Genus synonymy: Bellia Gray 1869; Species synonymy: Emys crassicollis Gray, 1831; Emys crassicolis Duméril & Bibron, 1835 (ex errore); Clemmys (Clemmys) crassicollis Fitzinger, 1835; Bellia crassicollis Gray, 1869; Bellia crassilabris Theobald, 1876 (ex errore); Pangshura cochinchinensis Tirant, 1885; Kachuga cochinchinensis Mocquard, 1907; Orlitia crassicollis Barbour, 1912; Siebenrockiella crassicollis Lindholm, 1929

= Black marsh turtle =

Species of turtle

Siebenrockiella crassicollis (commonly known as black marsh turtle, smiling terrapin, and Siamese temple turtle, among others) is a freshwater turtle endemic to Southeast Asia. It is one of two species classified under the genus Siebenrockiella in the family Geoemydidae.

Black marsh turtles are small to medium-sized turtles that are almost completely black except for white to yellow markings on the head. They are largely aquatic and prefer slow-moving or still bodies of water with heavy vegetation. Black marsh turtles are also commonly kept as pets and as sacred animals in Southeast Asian Buddhist temples.

They are classified as endangered by the IUCN, being one of the several Southeast Asian turtle species heavily exploited for the international wildlife trade, particularly for food and traditional medicine in the Chinese markets.

== Taxonomy and nomenclature ==
Formerly under the genus Emys, black marsh turtles are now classified under Siebenrockiella. They were first described by the British zoologist John Edward Gray from three specimens from the collections of Thomas Bell. Black marsh turtles used to be monotypic within the genus Siebenrockiella until Diesmos et al. (2005) showed based on genetic studies and morphology, that the recently rediscovered and critically endangered Philippine forest turtles, until that time known as Heosemys leytensis, were actually very closely related. Philippine forest turtles were subsequently reassigned to Siebenrockiella under the subgenus Panyaenemys.

They are classified under the subfamily Geoemydinae under the family Geoemydidae. Black marsh turtles are cryptodires, having the ability to pull their heads straight back into the shells; instead of folding their necks sideways along the body like in pleurodiran turtles.

The specific epithet "crassicollis" comes from Latin crassus ("thick") and collum ("neck"). The generic name was coined in honor of the Austrian zoologist Friedrich Siebenrock.

Siebenrockiella crassicollis are known by a variety of vernacular names among hobbyists, such as black terrapin, black mud turtle, Malaysian black mud turtle, fat-headed turtle, thick-necked turtle, and Borneo black leaf turtle. They are also known as kura-kura pipi-putih in Indonesian.

== Description ==
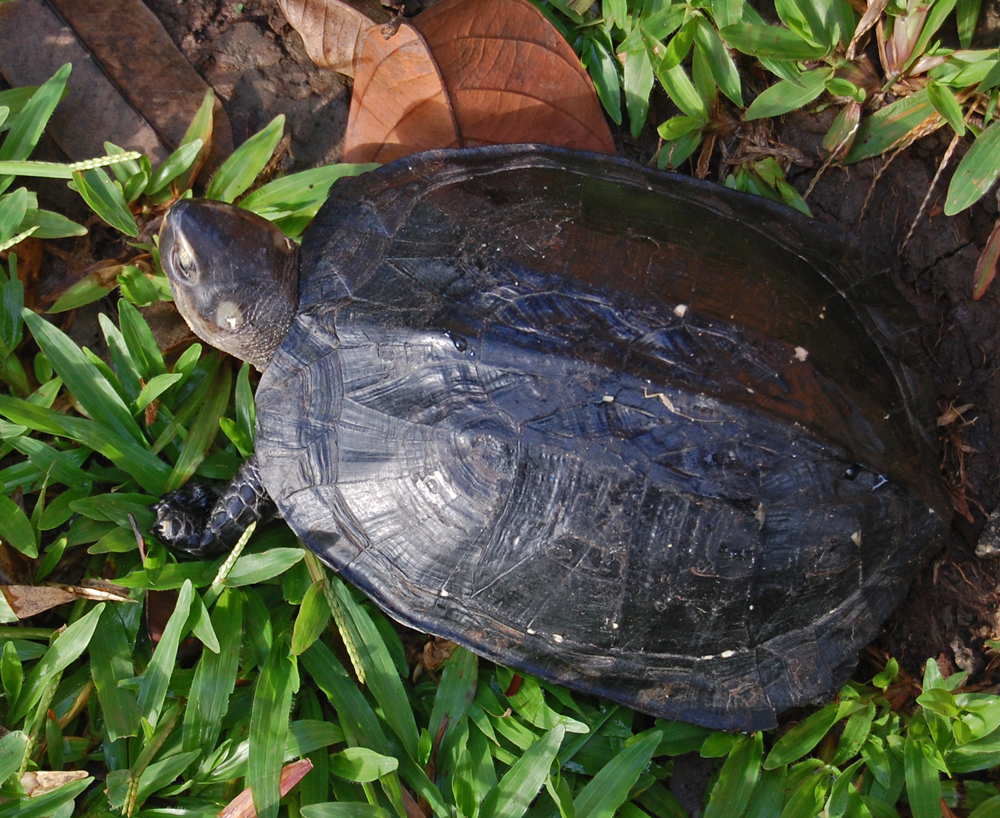
A black marsh turtle from Indonesia.

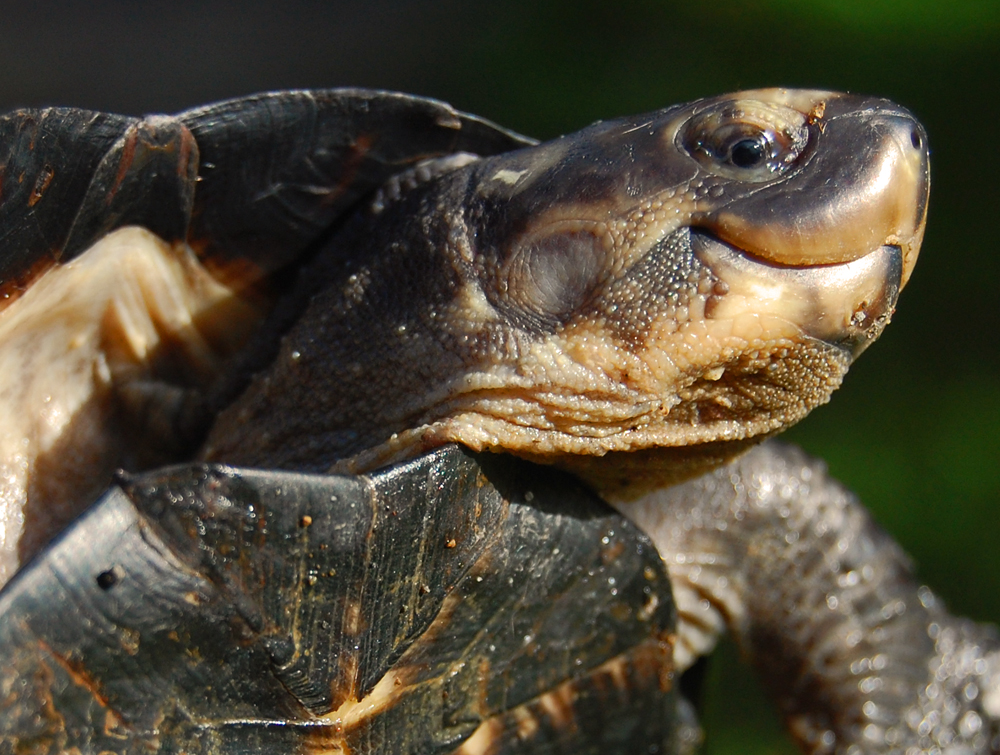
The shape of the upper jaws of black marsh turtles is the reason for their common name 'smiling terrapin'.

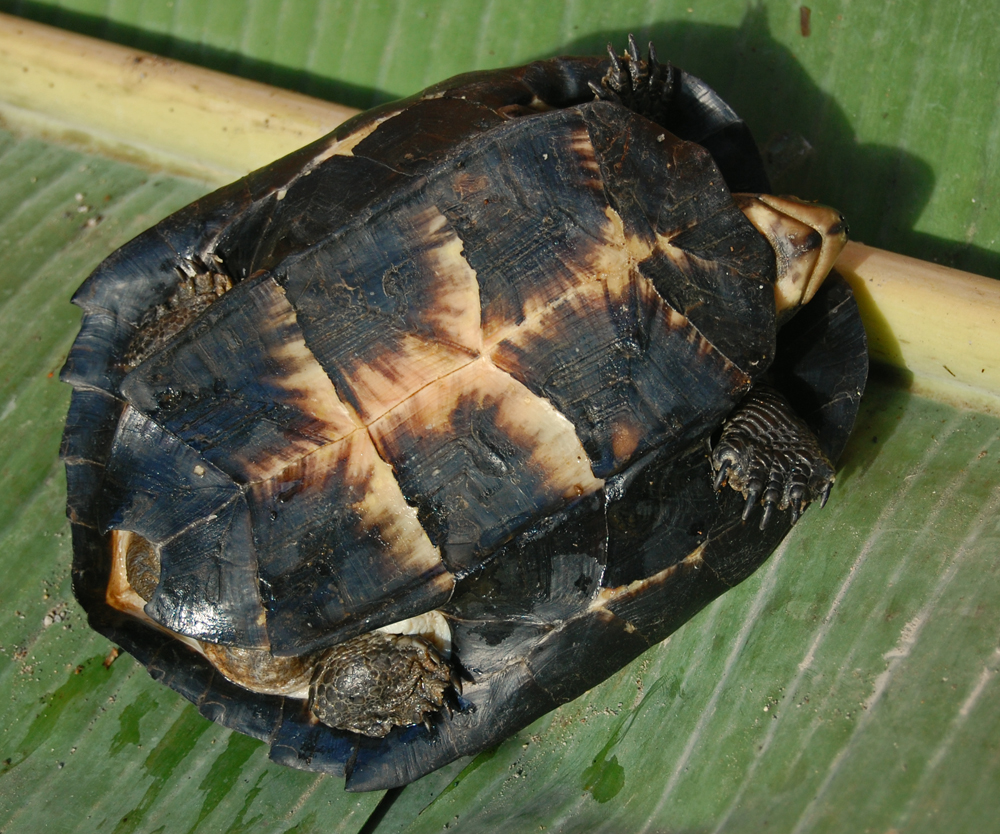
The plastron of a black marsh turtle.

Adult black marsh turtles are usually small to medium-sized, averaging at around 17 cm (6.7 in) in length and rarely exceeding 20 cm (7.9 in). Some individuals, however, are known to grow to twice this size. The ovoid carapace (the dorsal shell) is widest just behind the middle portion, with a strongly serrated posterior margin. A prominent central ridge (known as keels) also runs through the middle of the carapace. Two lateral keels are present as well, though they are not always visible. The carapace is almost entirely black or dark brown with black radiating patterns.

The plastron (the ventral shell) is not hinged and has a shallow U-shaped notch in the pair of anal scutes. The bridge (the parts connecting the abdominal and pectoral scutes of the plastron to the carapace) is approximately the same length as the rear part of the plastron (consisting of the femoral and anal scutes). Both the bridge and the plastron can be entirely black, dark brown, or yellowish with splotches or patterns of darker colors.

The forelimbs are covered with large transverse scales. Both the forelimbs and the hind limbs are webbed, reflecting their largely aquatic habits. The necks of black marsh turtles are characteristically thick, forming a collar around the head when it is retracted into the shell. All of the limbs, the tail, and the neck are dark gray to black. The head is broad with a short upwardly pointed snout. It is mostly black on top with cream to yellow markings around the eyes and at the throat. It also has a pair of pale white to yellow spots just behind the tympanum, usually hidden behind the folds of the neck. The powerful jaws are pale yellow to pale brown in color and curves upwards, earning it the charming name of 'smiling terrapin'.

Black marsh turtles are sexually dimorphic. Males have concave plastra in contrast to the flat plastron of females. The markings around the eyes and throat, present in all juveniles, disappear among males upon reaching adulthood while they are retained in females. The tails are also longer and thicker for males than for females.

Black marsh turtles have a diploid karyotype of 52 chromosomes. They are also notable for being the first turtle shown to exhibit an XX/XY system of chromosomal sex determination, specifically with macrochromosomes. Very rare in turtles where the gender of developing embryos are usually determined by environmental temperatures.

== Distribution and habitat ==
Black marsh turtles can be found in southern Vietnam, Cambodia, southern Myanmar (Tenasserim), central and peninsular Thailand, eastern and western Malaysia, Singapore, and the Indonesian islands of Java, Kalimantan, and Sumatra. A specimen discovered in the Cerucuk River on Belitung Island in May 2023 is the first official record of the species on the island and represents a significant range extension beyond previously recorded populations in Sumatra to the west and Borneo to the east.

Black marsh turtles live in slow-moving or stagnant warm waters with abundant vegetation – usually marshes, swamps, and ponds. As their common name implies, black marsh turtles are primarily aquatic and prefer to stay buried in soft mud when not feeding.

== Ecology and behavior ==
Black marsh turtles are predominantly carnivorous and prefer to feed underwater. They prey on insects, worms, molluscs, amphibians, crustaceans, and small fish, though they will occasionally scavenge rotting plants, fruits, or carcasses of larger animals that fall into the water. Juveniles are typically more carnivorous than adults.

Black marsh turtles are shy creatures. Mostly aquatic and nocturnal, they will sometimes come out to land at night to forage or mate, and occasionally during the day to bask. Majority of the time they prefer to stay underwater, partially buried in mud in shallow water or swimming near the bottom in deeper still waters.

When threatened, black marsh turtles excrete a foul-smelling secretion from their cloaca to ward off would-be predators. Their powerful jaws are also capable of inflicting wounds if handled roughly.

=== Life cycle ===
Black marsh turtles reach sexual maturity at five years. Nesting season occurs in the summer, between April and the end of June. In courtship, males will bob their heads up and down while chasing a female. It may bite the legs of the females several times before mating. Females will lay three or four clutches. Each clutch consisting usually of one or rarely two relatively large eggs, around 5 by 3 cm (2.0 by 1.2 in) and weighing 30 g (0.066 lb). The eggs are incubated for 68 to 84 days before hatching. The hatchlings are relatively large, measuring around 5 cm (2.0 in).

The maximum known lifespan of black marsh turtles observed in captivity is about 60 years.

== Relations with humans ==
Black marsh turtles are culturally important to Buddhism. In Thailand, large numbers of black marsh turtles, along with the yellow-headed temple turtles (Heosemys annandalii) are released into temple and castle ponds and cared for by Buddhist monks. They are treated as sacred by the public, being believed to contain the souls of people who died while trying to rescue other people from drowning. One of their commons names, Siamese temple turtle, originated from this practice.

In a study in 2010, black marsh turtles were among the turtles found to contain high levels of mercury in their tissues. Their consumption as food is discouraged as they have the potential to cause mercury poisoning.

Black marsh turtles are now being captive bred both for conservation and for the pet trade. In 2004, a black marsh turtle hatched at the Bristol Zoo Gardens. It was the first of its species to successfully hatch in a European zoo. Captive bred black marsh turtles are preferable as pets, being healthier and more acclimated to handling than individuals captured from the wild and illegally exported.

== Conservation ==
Black marsh turtles are classified as endangered by the International Union for Conservation of Nature. They are also listed on CITES Appendix II. Aside from signatories to CITES, Black marsh turtles are also specifically protected in Thailand under the Wild Animals Reservation Protection Act (WARPA). General laws against the trade and/or capture of freshwater turtles or wildlife that also extend to black marsh turtles are also in place in Myanmar, Singapore, and Vietnam.

Despite these sanctions, the greatest threat to black marsh turtles, along with other Southeast Asian freshwater turtles, is the rising demand for turtles for the international meat trade, particularly for the Chinese food markets. Black marsh turtle populations in Cambodia and Vietnam are already considered endangered for this reason. The plastra of black marsh turtles are also among those sought after for traditional Chinese medicine, particularly for a traditional preparation known as Kuei-Lu-Erh-Hsien-Chiao (KLEHC). Thousands of individuals are often confiscated regularly in shipments. Each representing just a small fraction of the actual number of wild turtles being caught and sold in the Asian markets. Official records in 1999 show that around 135,000 individuals were exported within the span of 10 months in Malaysia alone. In addition to this, black marsh turtles are increasingly being threatened in its native range by habitat loss.

== See also ==
- Siebenrockiella leytensis, the Philippine forest turtle
