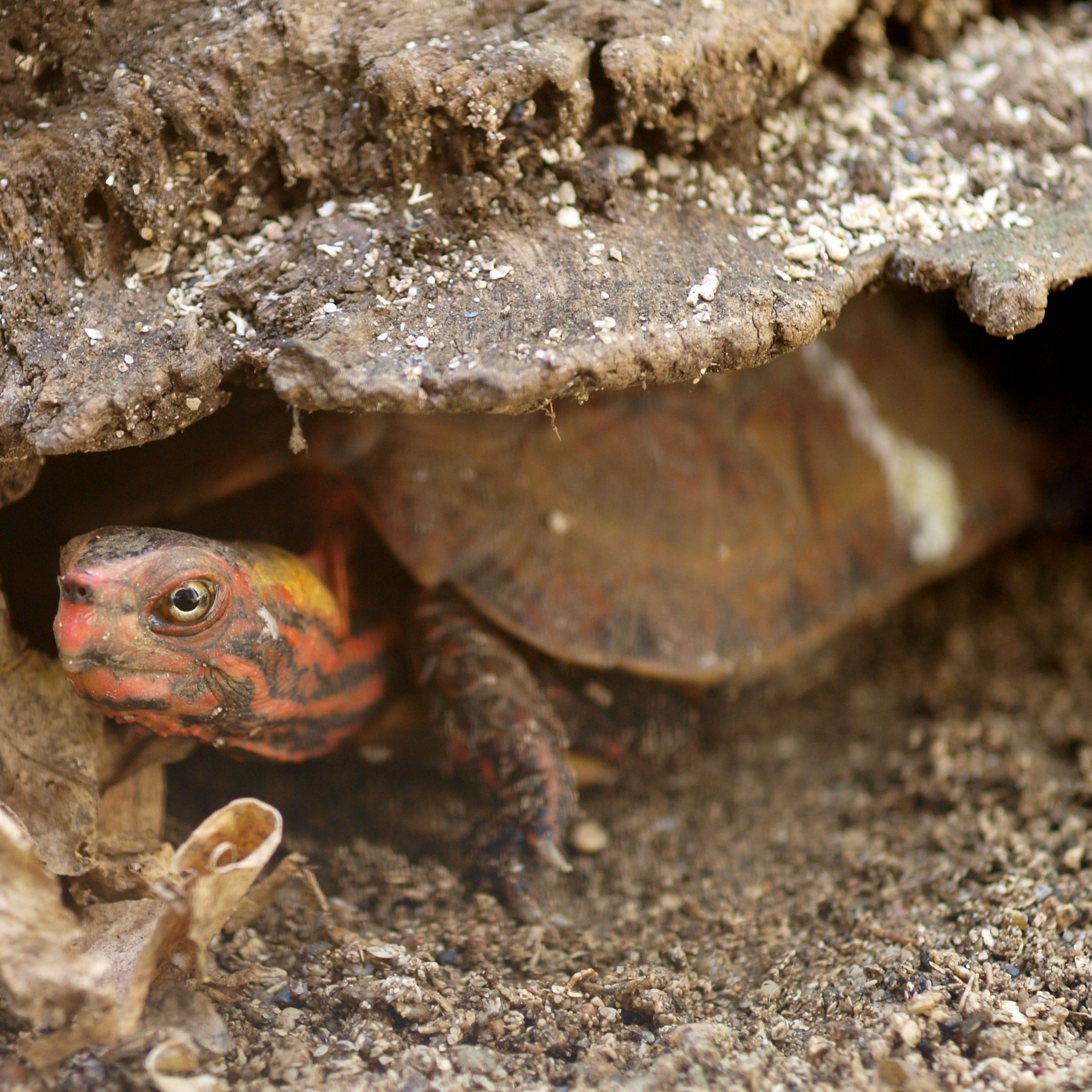

Conservation status
- Endangered (IUCN 3.1)
- CITES Appendix II

Scientific classification
- Kingdom: Animalia
- Phylum: Chordata
- Class: Reptilia
- Order: Testudines
- Suborder: Cryptodira
- Family: Geoemydidae
- Genus: Geoemyda
- Species: G. japonica

Binomial name
- Geoemyda japonica Fan, 1931

Synonyms
- Geoemyda spengleri japonica Fan, 1931; Geoemyda japonica Yasukawa, Ota & Hikida, 1992; Geoemyda japonicus Joseph-Ouni, 2004

= Ryukyu black-breasted leaf turtle =

Species of turtle

The Ryukyu black-breasted leaf turtle (Geoemyda japonica), also known commonly as the Okinawa black-breasted leaf turtle or the Ryukyu mountain turtle, is a species of turtle in the family Geoemydidae. It is endemic to the Ryukyu Islands in Japan, where it in 1975 was designated as a National Natural Monument after having been designated as a Local Natural Monument in Okinawa Prefecture in 1973.

== Systematics ==
The taxon was first described by Tsang-How Fan in 1931, then as a subspecies of Geoemyda spengleri. The type locality was given as "Japan and other Pacific Islands"; as of 2026 there is no designated holotype for the species. It had previously been studied by Shigefumi Okada in 1891, then as a population of Geoemyda spengleri, under the name Emys spengleri, as that species had not yet been given its own genus. The taxon was reclassified as a species in its own right by Yuichirou Yasukawa, Hidetoshi Ota and Tsutomu Hikida in 1992.

The species is one of the two living members of Geoemyda, alongside Geomyda spengleri, and is closely related to the extinct Geoemyda amamiensis, known from the island of Tokunoshima.

== Description ==
The Ryukyu black-breasted leaf turtle is a small species, having a carapace length of about 35.5 m (116 ft) as hatchlings and 65–155.7 mm (2.56–6.13 in) as adults. The carapace is elongated and slightly domed, with a base color that is variable but usually brownish. The plastron is large, elongated, rigid – with the exception of the hind lobes of mature females – and notched in both the front and the back, with a primarily black or dark brown color and light yellow to ivory margins towards the sides.

The head of the turtle is medium-sized, and the skull is elongated and flatter than usual for turtles. The base colour of the head is orange-yellow to yellowish, and is accompanied by irregular yellowish or reddish lines or spots. The limbs have a similar colouration, with a few light lines or spots on them.

== Ecology ==
Ryukyu black-breasted leaf turtles is terrestrial, usually being found on the floors of primary and well-developed secondary forests, and they have an apparent preference for humid areas, often being found near mountain streams.

They use small caves, cracks and crevices in large rocks and spaces under rocks and fallen trees as shelters, and have been reported to stay in and near a chosen shelter for up to seven months before moving on.

Hybrids between different genera of Geoemydidae are rather commonplace. This species is known to hybridize with Cuora flavomarginata males in captivity and in the wild.

== Distribution ==
The species is endemic to the Japanese islands of Okinawa, Kume and Tokashiki, all three part of the Okinawa group of the Ryukyu Islands. It is threatened by habitat loss due to deforestation, which has led to it being listed as an endangered species on the IUCN Red List.
