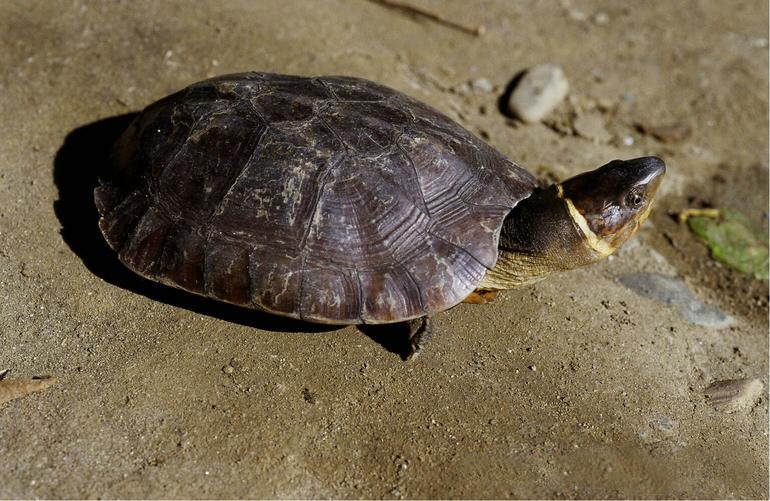
- Profile of Philippine forest turtle

Conservation status
- Critically Endangered (IUCN 3.1)
- CITES Appendix II

Scientific classification
- Kingdom: Animalia
- Phylum: Chordata
- Class: Reptilia
- Order: Testudines
- Suborder: Cryptodira
- Family: Geoemydidae
- Genus: Siebenrockiella
- Species: S. leytensis

Binomial name
- Siebenrockiella leytensis (Taylor, 1920)
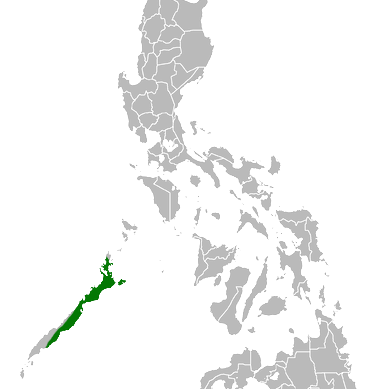
- Known areas of occurrence of Siebenrockiella leytensis.

Synonyms
- Heosemys leytensis Taylor, 1920; Geoemyda leytensis Mertens, Müller & Rust, 1934; Geomyda leytensis Wermuth & Mertens, 1977; Siebenrockiella leytensis Diesmos, Parham, Stuart & Brown, 2005; Panayaenemys leytensis Vetter, 2006

= Philippine forest turtle =

Species of turtle

Siebenrockiella leytensis is a species of freshwater turtle endemic to the Philippines. It is classified as critically endangered. It is known as the Philippine forest turtle, the Philippine pond turtle, the Palawan turtle, or the Leyte pond turtle. Despite the latter common name, it does not occur in the island of Leyte but is instead native to the Palawan island group. It is locally known as bakoko in Cuyonon.

Philippine forest turtles are readily recognizable by their ginkgo-shaped vertebral scutes and a pale white to yellow line traversing across its head behind the ears. The previous characteristic has earned it the nickname of 'bowtie turtle'.

Philippine forest turtles are classified under the subgenus Panyaenemys. Together with the smiling terrapin (Siebenrockiella crassicollis), it is one of the two species in the genus Siebenrockiella.

== Description ==
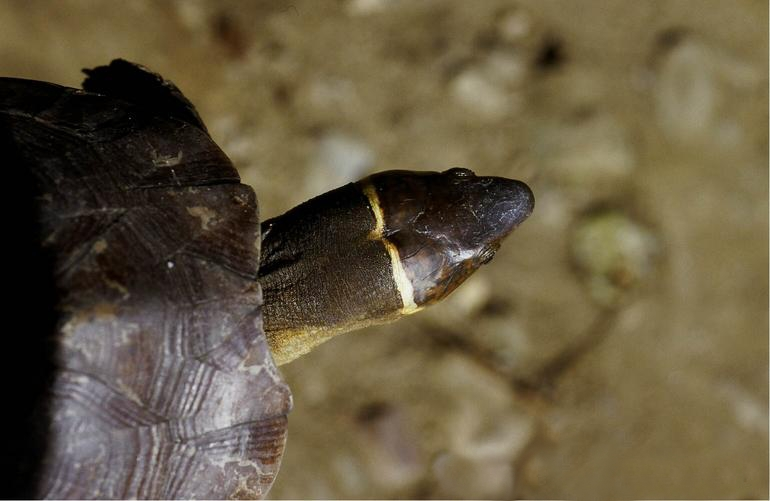
S. leytensis has a distinctive pale band of color running across the head just behind the ear openings.

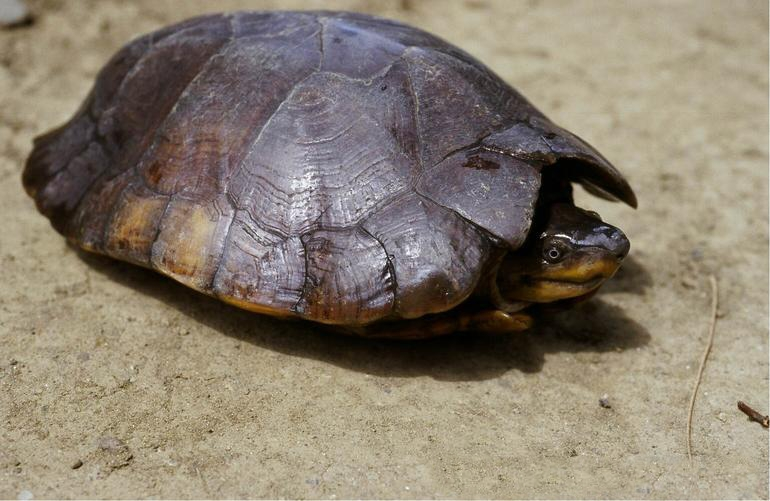
The anterior margin of the carapace of S. leytensis is slightly to strongly serrated.

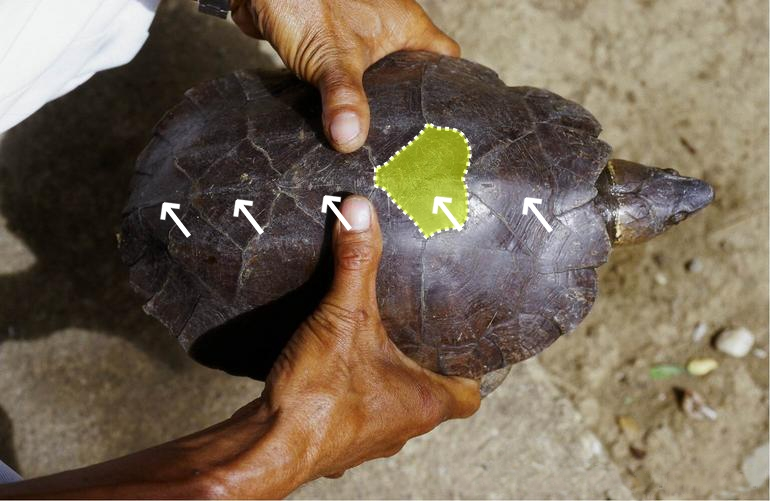
The distinctive ginkgo-shaped vertebral scutes of the Philippine forest turtle.

Philippine forest turtles have brown to reddish brown to black carapaces that reach a length of 21 cm (8.3 in). Larger individuals can reach 30 cm (12 in) in length, though this is relatively rare. A dorsal ridge (the keel) is only present in the posterior vertebral scutes or absent altogether. The front margin of the carapace is slightly to strongly serrated, with the marginal scutes projecting beyond the cervical scutes. The vertebral scutes are broader than long.

The plastron is reddish brown to black, sometimes with blotches of yellow. In juveniles, the plastron is a uniform yellow. The bridge (the hinge connecting plastron and carapace) is the same color as the plastron. It is significantly smaller than the carapace and narrow at the front and back. It possesses deep notches between the projecting gular scutes as well as between the gulars and humerals, but it is more distinct in the former.

Its plastral formula is abd > pect > fem > gul > hum > an.

The skin of the legs, body, and neck are rough in appearance, being covered in tiny tubercles. The head is brown in color, sometimes speckled at the temples with light brown, orange, or red spots. A thin white to pale yellow line traverses through the width of the head just behind the openings of the ears, it may be divided at the center in some individuals. This has led to the species being nicknamed as the 'bowtie turtle'. The line is more prominent in younger individuals.

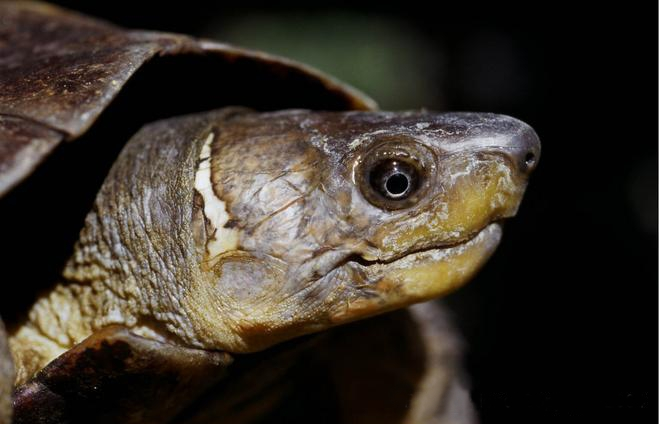
Close-up of the head showing the hooked upper jaw.

The upper jaw is hooked and the skin on the sides of the neck and the chin are lighter in color. The lower jaw may also sometimes possess a pair of small yellow spots on the sides.

The legs possess irregular enlarged transverse scales and are darker in color at the front. Four transverse scales are present on the forelimbs and more at the hind limbs (though absent at the heels). All limbs are webbed and possess large claws on all toes. The tail is uniformly light brown in color.

Philippine forest turtles are relatively easy to recognize. They can be distinguished from all other turtles by their strongly projecting epiplastra, vertebral scutes shaped like ginkgo leaves, the absence of temporal arches in the skull, and the aforementioned light lines behind its head.

The Malaysian giant turtle (Orlitia borneensis) and the smiling terrapin (Siebenrockiella crassicollis) are the only other turtle species with ginkgo-shaped vertebral scutes, but they do not possess the white to pale yellow line on the back of their heads.

== Taxonomy and nomenclature ==
The scientific name of Philippine forest turtles is Siebenrockiella leytensis. It is classified under the genus Siebenrockiella in the subgenus Panyaenemys (frequently misspelled as "Panayanemys" and "Panyanemys"). It belongs to the subfamily Geoemydinae of the family Geoemydidae.

Formerly classified under the genus Heosemys, it was transferred to the previously monotypic genus Siebenrockiella by Diesmos et al. in 2005 based on morphological and genetic comparison with Siebenrockiella crassicollis.

The subgenus name is derived after the Pala'wan word panya-en. The word was used by a local Palawan resident to describe the turtles in a 2003 survey. The word means 'enchanted', supposedly because Philippine forest turtles were favorite pets of the forest spirits. -emys comes from the Greek word εμύς, meaning 'freshwater turtle'.

The generic name was coined in honor of the Austrian zoologist Friedrich Siebenrock. While the specific name means 'from [the island of] Leyte'. An erroneous name, as the turtle is actually from the islands of Palawan and is not found in Leyte.

== History of discovery ==
Philippine forest turtles were first described by the American herpetologist Edward Harrison Taylor in 1920 as Heosemys leytensis. He described them on the basis of two specimens (male and female) collected by Gregorio Lopez, allegedly from the swamps of the municipality of Cabalian in Southern Leyte (now known as the municipality of San Juan). These specimens were unfortunately destroyed in World War II during the firebombing of Manila.

No other specimens were reported until 1988 when a specimen was bought from a local resident in Taytay, Palawan. Believing that the turtle got there through interisland trade, numerous herpetologists searched Southern Leyte for other individuals. Their lack of success led to fears that the turtle was already extinct.

In 2001, during an assessment of endemic wildlife of the island of Palawan, live specimens of Philippine forest turtles were rediscovered. It soon became apparent that natural populations of the species existed in Palawan. Diesmos et al. (2004) have concluded that Taylor and/or Lopez may have somehow confused the type locality of the original specimens. Lopez also collected turtle specimens from the islands of Coron and Busuanga in Palawan. Specimens from Palawan may have been mistakenly exchanged with actual specimens from Leyte (which were probably Cyclemys dentata). It is now presumed that Philippine forest turtles have never been introduced outside of Palawan, and thus were not actually from Leyte.

== Distribution and habitat ==
Philippine forest turtles are known only from northern Palawan and surrounding islands. This includes the island of Dumaran where the species is still relatively abundant in creeks. Elsewhere, it is believed their populations are declining sharply. Particularly in the areas of Taytay and San Vicente. Its distribution area is estimated to be less than 100 km^{2}.

== Ecology and behavior ==
Philippine forest turtle populations often exist alongside other more common native turtle species, including Asian leaf turtles (Cyclemys dentata) and Southeast Asian box turtles (Cuora amboinensis).

Due to its rarity and its status as newly rediscovered, little is known of the life cycle of the Philippine forest turtle. From observations, however, Philippine forest turtles appear to exhibit long life spans and high adult survival rates. Like most turtles, their sexual maturation is delayed but they are able to mate multiple times before death (iteroparity).

Captive adults confiscated from illegal traders were provided a large outside pool with well planted islands and numerous underwater rock formations in Malabon Zoo in Manila. But they proved to be very shy and retiring, spending considerable time hiding under rocks, both in and out of the water. They took some months to adjust to confinement. Observations indicate that they are omnivorous, favouring commercial turtle food, aquatic plants and they have been observed hunting small fish and crustaceans. They became active in the early morning and late evening, foraging for food, and moved about during the night. They were not observed to be keen on basking in the sun, but this may have been the result of being in a captive environment.

Known food sources of Philippine forest turtles in the wild include figs.

== Threats ==
The Philippine Forest turtle is a freshwater turtle species and is of interest of turtle hobbyists. Due to the previous inability to locate it in the wild, probable threats from habitat loss, and potential pressure from collectors, this turtle is listed as critically endangered.

Due to the susceptibility of the species to stress and the extremely aggressive territorial behavior of male individuals, Philippine forest turtles do not do well in captivity. Nevertheless, as of 2009, a considerable number of these turtles (over 171 individuals documented in a span of four years) were to be found for sale illegally in major Manila pet markets, particularly in the main Chinese markets (where the turtles are sold cheaper). The animals are not sold openly and some of the buyers are overseas collectors. Most of the individuals were juveniles or young adults. Between 2009 and 2011 this species ranked sixth among the most commonly confiscated species in the Philippines. These animals had been collected from mud wallows in northern Palawan, and it is believed that they hide during the daylight hours.

Additionally, many specimens (from Palawan) offered for sale had small holes bored in the carapace, indicating that some at least had been held captive as pets and tethered accordingly. Local Palawan people are known to keep these animals in water troughs for domestic pigs, as these are supposed to bring luck for the household and the pigs, although it is not known if this luck is shared by the turtles.

The unconfirmed existence of illegal trade of Palawan turtles to Borneo, Malaysia, is also a cause of concern.

== Conservation ==
Although some studies into their habitats have been commenced by several Philippines academic institutions, lack of funding has prevented full study, and they must be still considered endangered, especially from collecting, until further research had been carried out.

Trade is banned internationally under the CITES convention, as well as domestically under the Philippines Wildlife Act.

Some eighteen individuals have been donated to the Malabon Zoo north of Manila.

Recent legislation in the Philippines requires pet owners and traders to register their animals with the authorities, and pay for licences to keep the more "exotic" pets. It is hoped that this may prove to reduce the collection of various endangered species, including the Philippines Pond Turtle. The entirety of the Palawan group of islands is also a nationally protected area.
