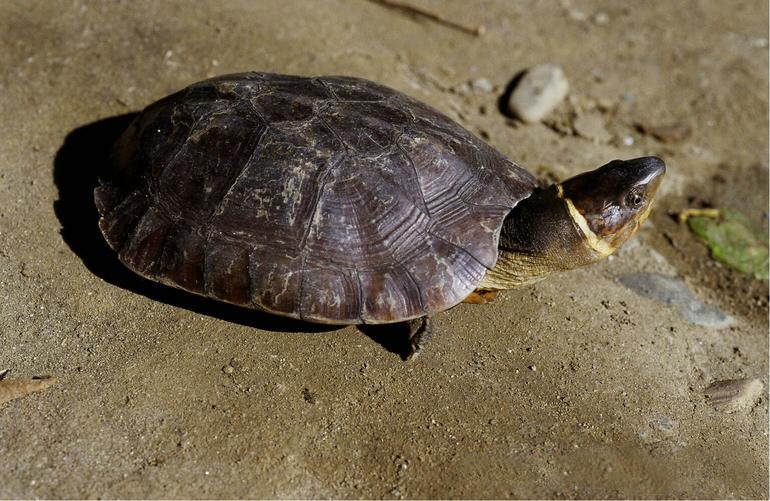
- The critically endangered Siebenrockiella leytensis

Scientific classification
- Kingdom: Animalia
- Phylum: Chordata
- Class: Reptilia
- Order: Testudines
- Suborder: Cryptodira
- Family: Geoemydidae
- Subfamily: Geoemydinae
- Genus: Siebenrockiella; Lindholm, 1929

Species
- S. crassicollis (Gray, 1831); S. leytensis (Taylor, 1920)

Synonyms
- Bellia Gray, 1869

= Siebenrockiella =

Genus of turtles

Siebenrockiella is a small genus of black marsh turtles. It used to be monotypic but now has two species with the addition of the Philippine forest turtle (moved from the genus Heosemys). The genus was originally erected in 1869 by John Edward Gray under the name Bellia, commemorating Thomas Bell, but this name is a junior homonym of Bellia Milne-Edwards, 1848, a crustacean genus. The replacement name, Siebenrockiella, was published in 1929 by Wassili Adolfovitch Lindholm, and commemorates Friedrich Siebenrock.

== Species ==
- Siebenrockiella crassicollis (Gray, 1831) – black marsh turtle
- Siebenrockiella leytensis (Taylor, 1920) – Philippine forest turtle
