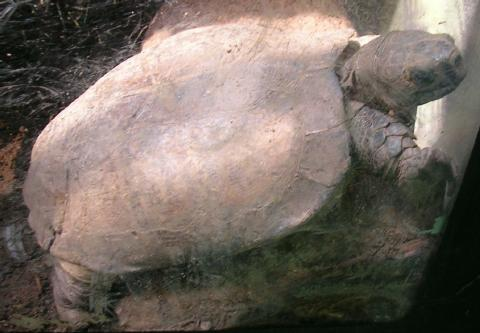
- Arakan forest turtle in Atlanta Zoo

Conservation status
- Critically Endangered (IUCN 3.1)
- CITES Appendix II

Scientific classification
- Kingdom: Animalia
- Phylum: Chordata
- Class: Reptilia
- Order: Testudines
- Suborder: Cryptodira
- Family: Geoemydidae
- Genus: Heosemys
- Species: H. depressa

Binomial name
- Heosemys depressa (Anderson, 1875)

Synonyms
- Geoemyda depressa Anderson, 1875; Geoemyda arakana Theobald, 1876; Heosemys depressa Stejneger, 1902

= Arakan forest turtle =

Species of turtle

The Arakan forest turtle (Heosemys depressa) is a critically endangered turtle species native to the Arakan Hills in western Myanmar and the bordering Chittagong Hill Tracts in Bangladesh. The Arakan forest turtle is a semiterrestrial turtle, meaning it can survive in aquatic as well as terrestrial habitats, but adults prefer living in terrestrial habitats.

== Taxonomy ==
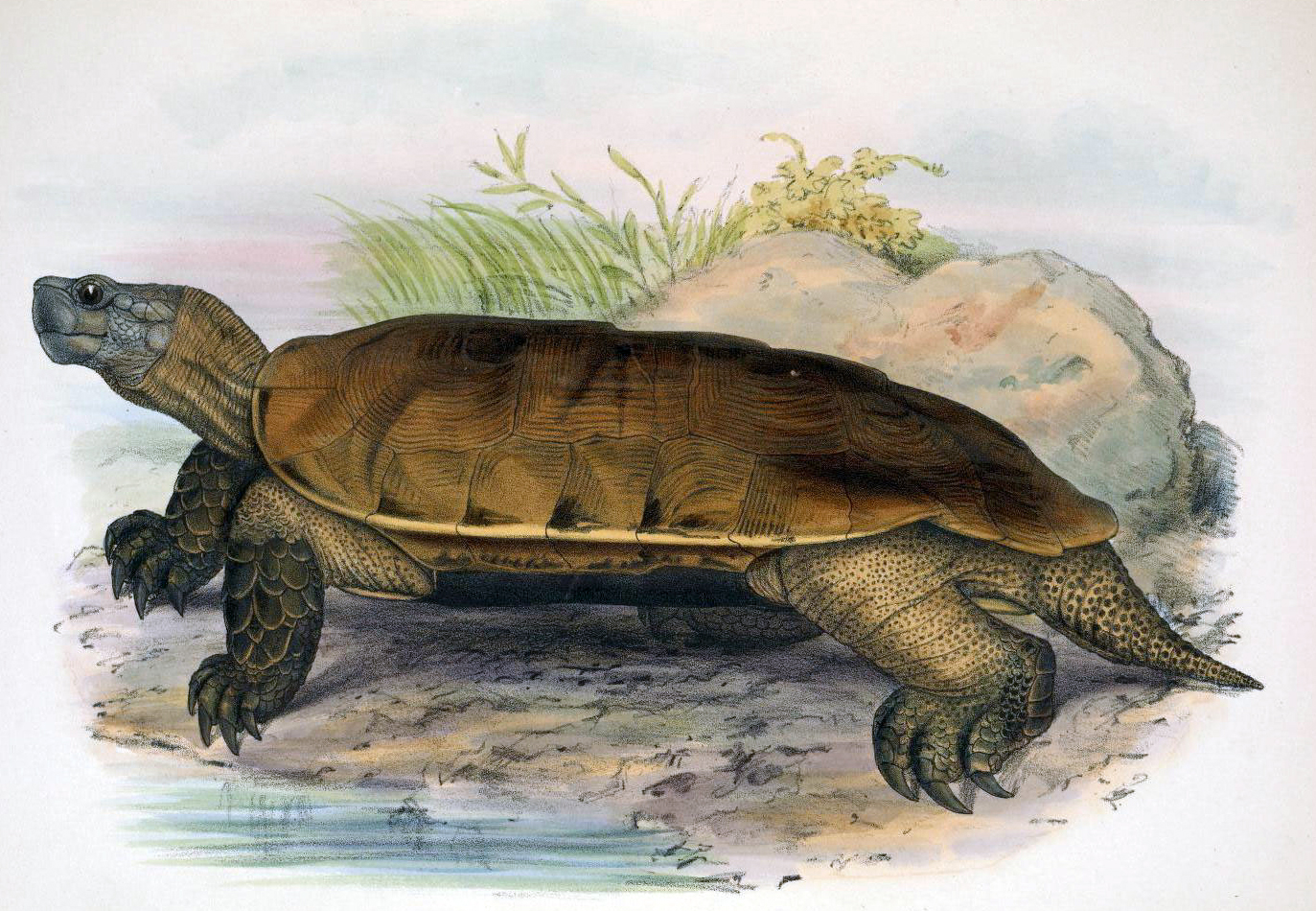
Illustration from 1878

Geoëmyda depressa was the scientific name proposed by Anderson in 1875 who described a zoological specimen collected in Arakan.

== Characteristics ==
The Arakan forest turtle has 18 plastral annuli, a carapace length of 22 cm (8.7 in) and weighs 1.3 kg (2.9 lb).

== Distribution and habitat ==
In 2009, the Arakan forest turtles was discovered in Rakhine Yoma Elephant Range in Myanmar. The scientific team also labeled the area as a good prospective place to focus conservation efforts for the turtle, despite the fact that locals do occasionally hunt and eat them. Even with those activities, this protected area is difficult to access and lacks any human settlement, making any human interference with the turtle merely opportunistic. No large-scale commercial project hunts the turtle, nor would there be a demand for one, since the turtle is too difficult to find compared to the little profit there is for doing so. Furthermore, the area even has a low risk of being exploited for natural resources.

In 2015, a potential population was discovered during a non-governmental organization's citizen science project, suggesting a population of the Arakan turtle may reside in the Chittagong Hill Tracts.

== Behaviour and ecology ==
The Arakan forest turtle is active at night and increases its activity during the early wet season. Local hunters found eggs in June and July when skinning female specimens, possibly revealing the reproductive system and cycle of the species. It remains dormant the majority of the time and hides in leaves and debris. It is an omnivore, feeding on both animals and plants. Although it is considered a relatively reserved animal for the majority of its daily activity, it is aggressive when it comes to eating insects, worms, and fish. It also consumes fruit that falls to the forest floor.

== Threats ==
Arakan forest turtles are being traded by animal pet dealers in China, who catch them in western Myanmar. In 2003, researchers took samples for research from nine Arakan forest turtles that had been imported to the Czech Republic to be kept in a private collection.

== Conservation ==
=== In captivity ===
As of 2009, a small number of turtles were present in captivity, and as of 2009, only the Zoo Atlanta has successfully bred the turtles in captivity.
