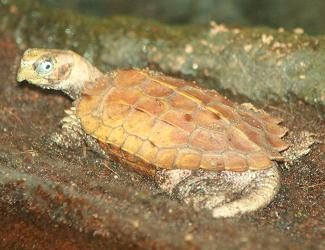

Conservation status
- Endangered (IUCN 3.1)
- CITES Appendix II

Scientific classification
- Kingdom: Animalia
- Phylum: Chordata
- Class: Reptilia
- Order: Testudines
- Suborder: Cryptodira
- Family: Geoemydidae
- Genus: Geoemyda
- Species: G. spengleri

Binomial name
- Geoemyda spengleri (Gmelin, 1789)

Synonyms
- Testudo spengleri Gmelin, 1789; Emys spengleri — Schweigger, 1812; Geoemyda spengleri — Gray, 1834; Clemmys (Clemmys) spengleri — Fitzinger, 1835; Nicoria spengleri — Gray, 1856; Geomyda spengleri — Mell, 1929; Geoemyda spengleri sinensis Fan, 1931; Geoemyda spengleri spengleri — Pope, 1934

= Black-breasted leaf turtle =

Species of turtle

The black-breasted leaf turtle (Geoemyda spengleri), also commonly called the Vietnamese leaf turtle or the black-breasted hill turtle, a species of turtle (Order Testudines). The species is listed as one of the smallest turtle species in the world. The species is endemic to Southeast Asia and is listed as endangered as of July 16, 2018.

== Classification ==
The black-breasted leaf turtle is a species of turtle in the family Geoemydidae (formerly called Bataguridae).

== Etymology ==
The specific name, spengleri, is in honor of Danish naturalist Lorenz Spengler.

== Characteristics ==
They are one of the smallest turtle species weighing from 90 to 150 grams and can be recognized for its black markings among the plastron while its carapace resembles a leaf. Much is not known about the behavior of G. spengleri but it is said they are solitary and terrestrial animals. They also have the ability to move their eyes independently to observe their surroundings. These turtles have an estimated lifespan of 20–24 years.

== Geographic range ==
G. spengleri is found in the montane forests of China, Vietnam and Laos. They can be found in the Ryukyu Islands of Japan through China to the Quang Nam Province of Vietnam. They are also found in non-native regions as a result of trade or release. G. spengleri occurrences have been recorded at high and mid elevations of 1000 meters and 500 meters but there is no set geographical distribution as result of limited surveying.

== Habitat ==
G. spengleri inhabits unfragmented forests and woodlands near shallow freshwater streams. Its suitable habitats consist of subtropical, tropical moist montane and wetland forests. Adult G. spengleri reside under canopies or shade in suitable temperatures as low as 40 °F to 90 °F. They need sufficient habitat to nest in open areas.

== Diet ==
While the feeding behaviors have not been observed in the wild, it is found that G. spengleri turtles are omnivores and have indicated a feeding diet of snails, leaves, fruits and insects through fecal substance. They may also feed on crustaceans. In captivity, this species may feed on small invertebrates and meats but prefer live prey such as earthworms, crickets, slugs and pill bugs.

== Reproduction ==
Sexual dimorphism plastral kinesis is present in mature G. spengleri where females have a flexible connection between carapace and hypoplastron whereas males have a bony structure. Reproduction in the wild has not been recorded but in captivity, females tend to lay one or two eggs per clutch.

== Predation ==
Black-breasted leaf turtle can evade predation through the camouflage of its carapace. Known predators of G. spengleri consist of humans, wild boar, hunting dogs and civets.

== Endangerment ==
Through locality samples from the three Chinese provinces, Guangdong, Guangxi, and Hainan, G. spengleri is found to be one of the surviving species due to its secretive terrestrial mode of life and small size. They are seen going extinct due to overexploitation and large-scale habitat alteration such as logging. They are also used in pet trade and trade for medicinal uses. A large quantity of these turtles are being sold in markets of Guangdong, Guanxi and Hainan provinces in China and Hong Kong causing a decline of about 70% in G. spengleri populations.

G. spengleri is still present in many regions where other chelonian species are extinct or near extinct.

== Conservation efforts ==
The IUCN has listed G. spengleri as an endangered species as well as being listed under second grade of China's Nation's Top Priority under Protected Wild Animals. However, the species is not protected under Vietnam's protection regulations.

G. spengleri can be found in protected zoos such as Central Florida Zoo & Botanical Gardens, Cincinnati Zoo, Fort Wayne's Zoo and several others in the United States of America.
