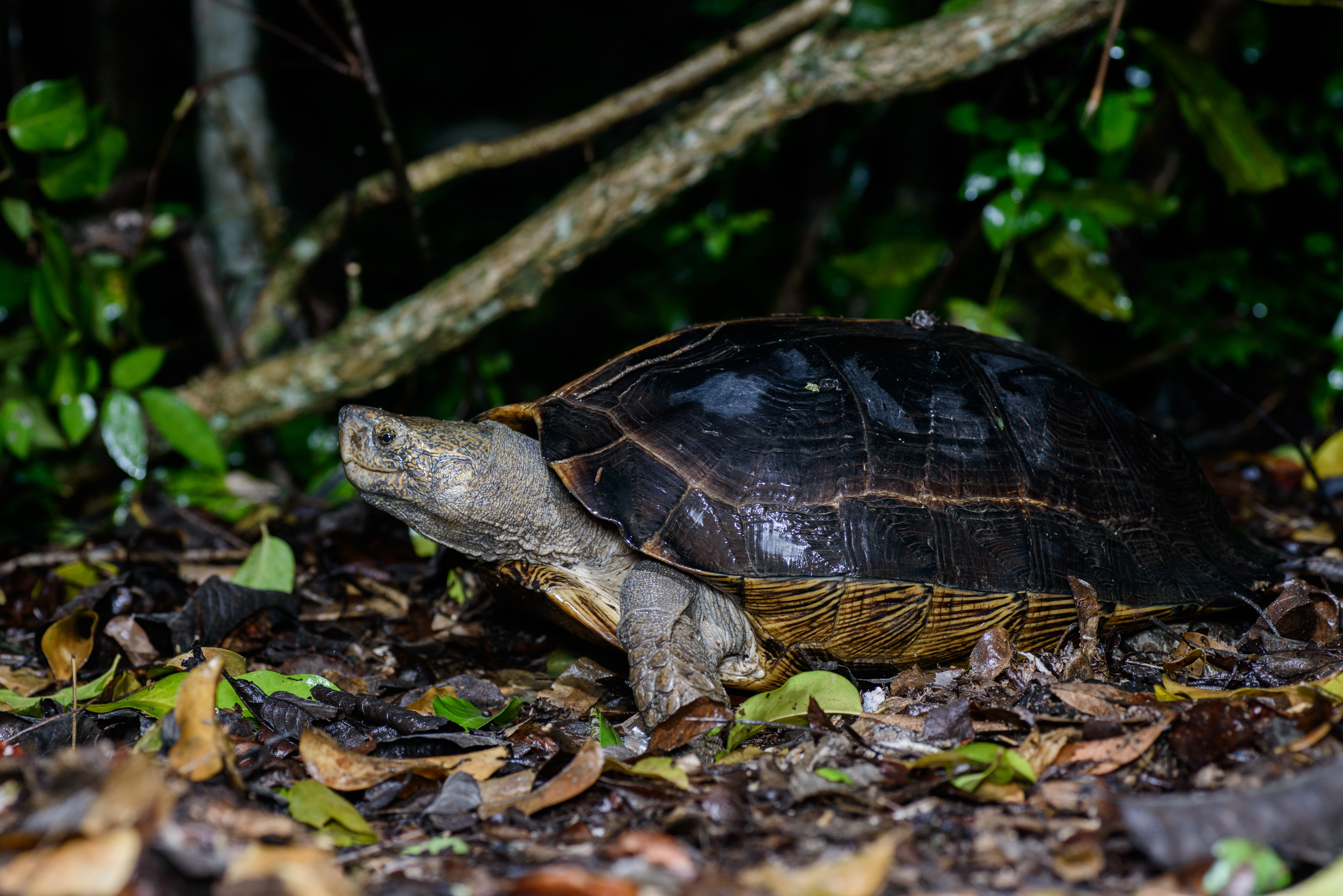
- Kaeng Krachan District, Phetchaburi, Thailand

Conservation status
- Critically Endangered (IUCN 3.1)
- CITES Appendix II

Scientific classification
- Kingdom: Animalia
- Phylum: Chordata
- Order: Testudines
- Suborder: Cryptodira
- Family: Geoemydidae
- Genus: Heosemys
- Species: H. grandis

Binomial name
- Heosemys grandis (Gray, 1860)

Synonyms
- Geoemyda grandis Gray, 1860; Clemmys grandis Strauch, 1862; Heosemys grandis Stejneger, 1902

= Giant Asian pond turtle =

Species of turtle

The giant Asian pond turtle (Heosemys grandis) inhabits rivers, streams, marshes, and rice paddies from estuarine lowlands to moderate altitudes (up to about 400 metres (1,300 ft)) throughout Cambodia and Vietnam and in parts of Laos, Malaysia, Myanmar, Thailand, and India.

== Description ==
Slight variations in coloration can be seen among the species. The carapace of the giant Asian pond turtle has a brown to black coloration with a distinct ridge along the center while the plastron is yellow in color. The head is gray to brown in color.

== Habitat and behavior ==
Capable of living in water or on land the giant Asian pond turtle can be located along bodies of water such as lakes, ponds, rivers, streams, and canals. The giant Asian pond turtle is omnivorous and finds food in both aquatic and terrestrial environments. Their diets consist of worms, larvae, insects, snails, deceased animals, and aquatic and terrestrial plants. Similarly to other species of turtles, the giant Asian pond turtle has developed adaptations and different techniques for capturing prey in both types of environments.

== Major threats ==
The main area of concern is the illegal capture and export of these turtles for use as food and (less commonly) as pets in parts of Asia. Additionally, their habitat is threatened by land conversion for agriculture.

== Gallery ==
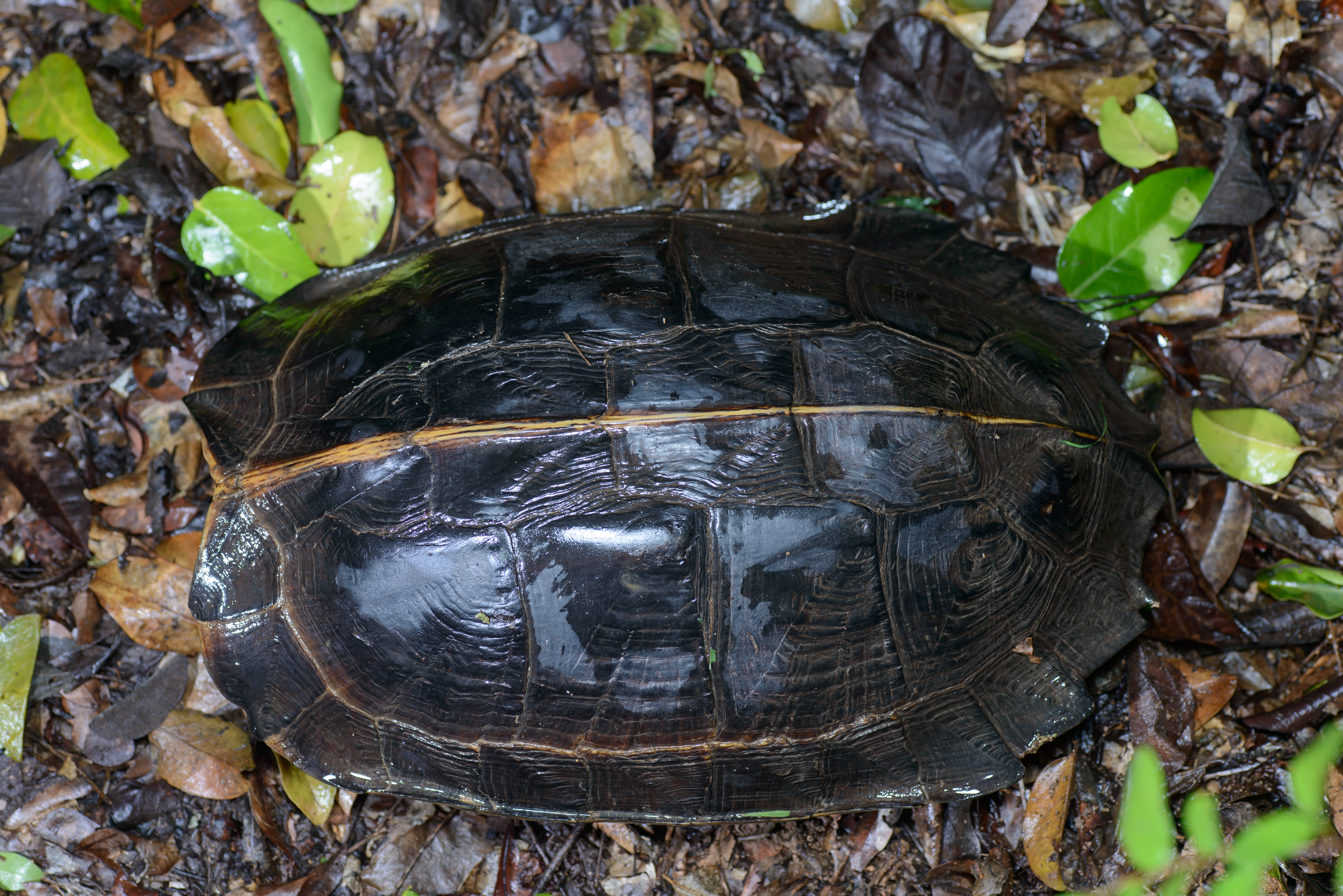
Adult, carapace view, in Kaeng Krachan District, Phetchaburi

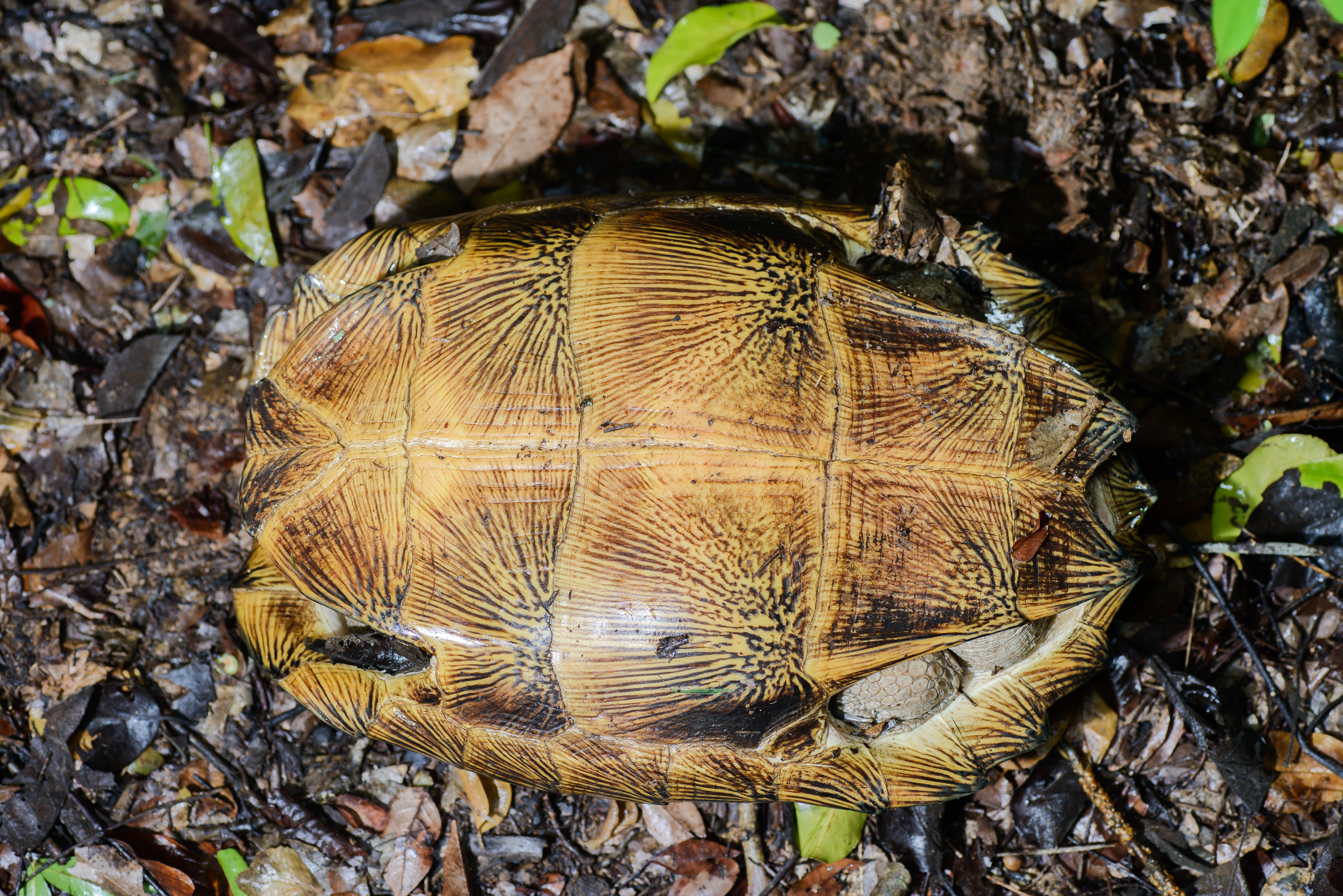
Adult, plastron view, in Kaeng Krachan District

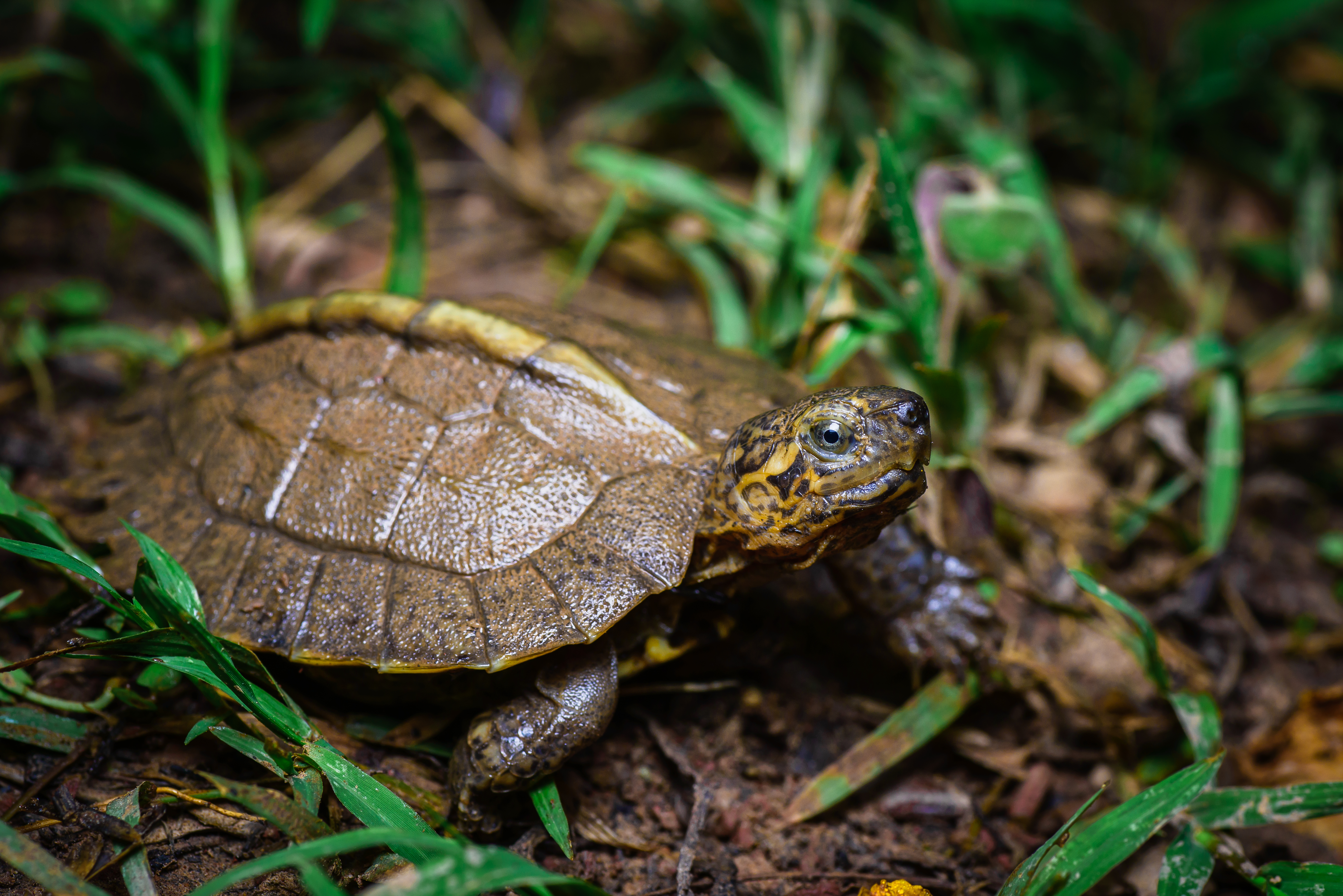
Juvenile in Tha Yang District, Phetchaburi

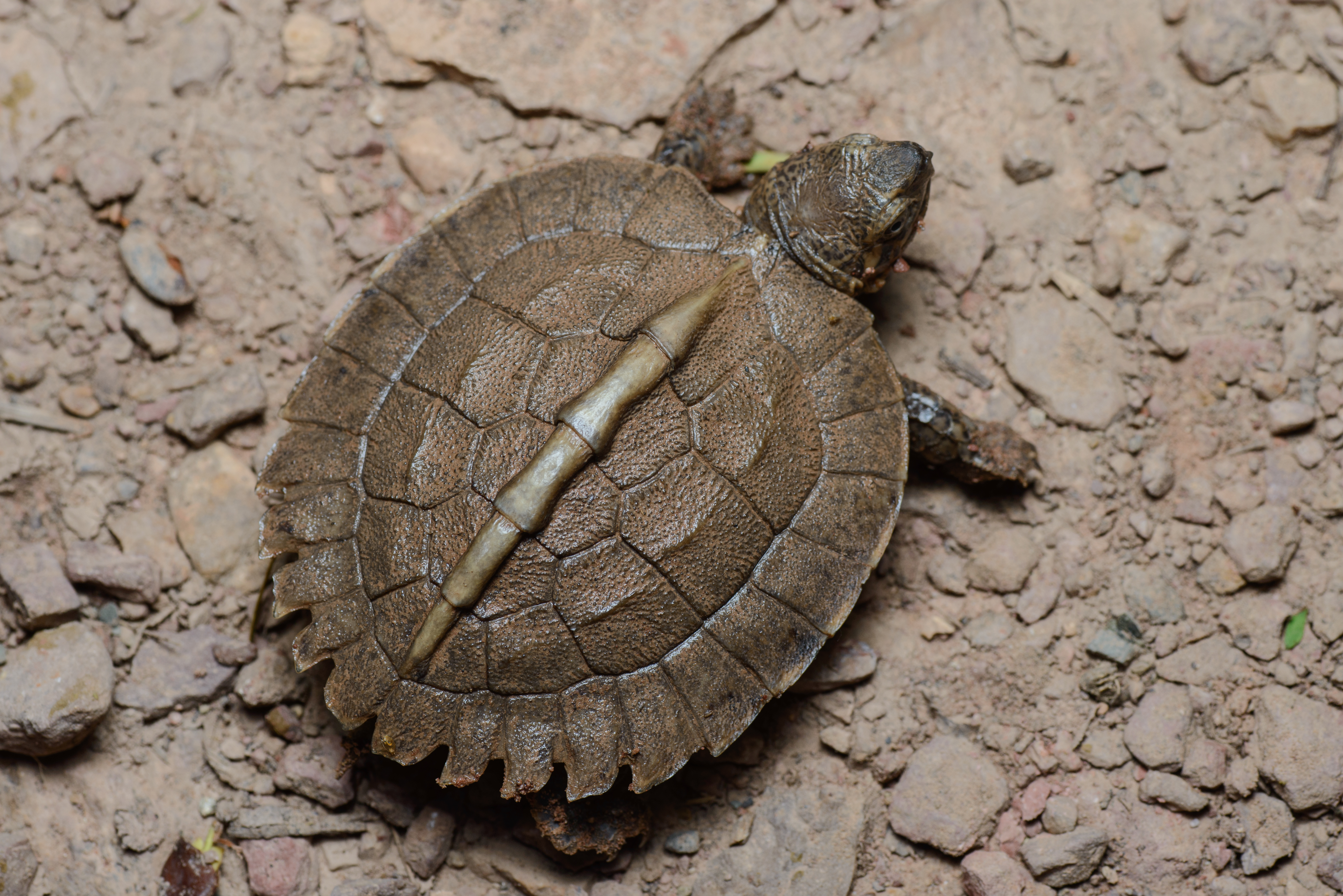
Juvenile, carapace view, in Tha Yang District

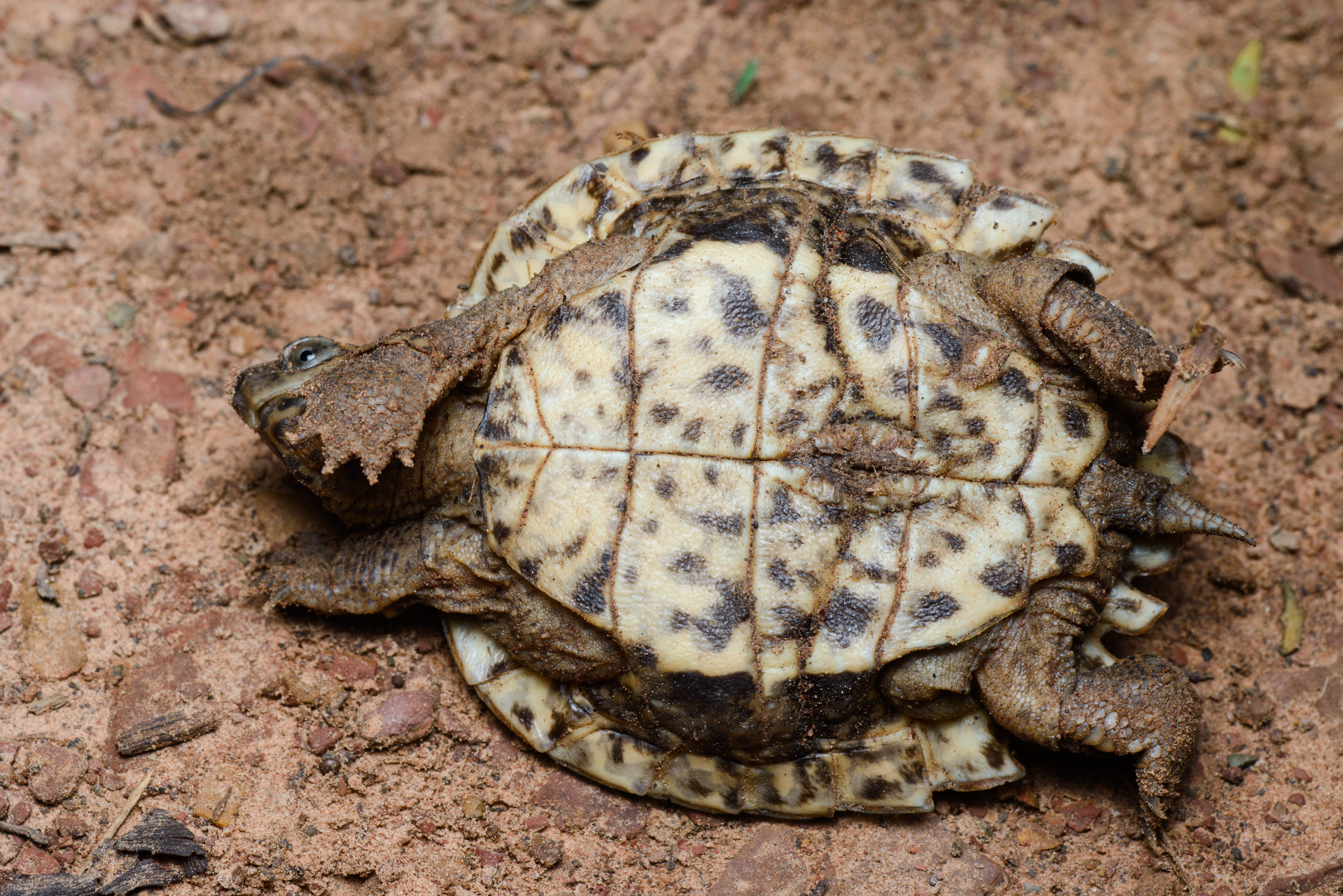
Juvenile, plastron view, in Tha Yang District

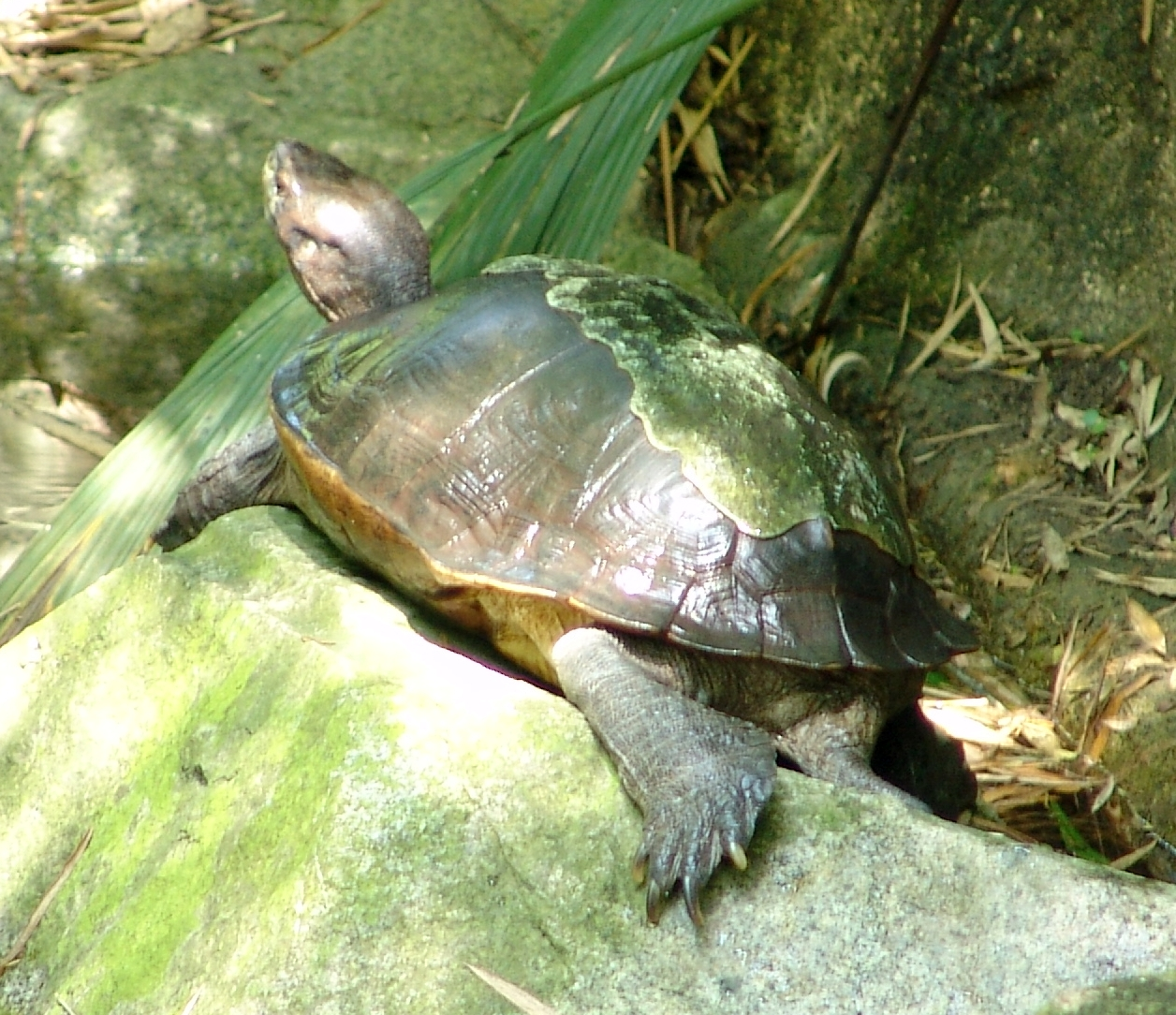
In Singapore Zoo
