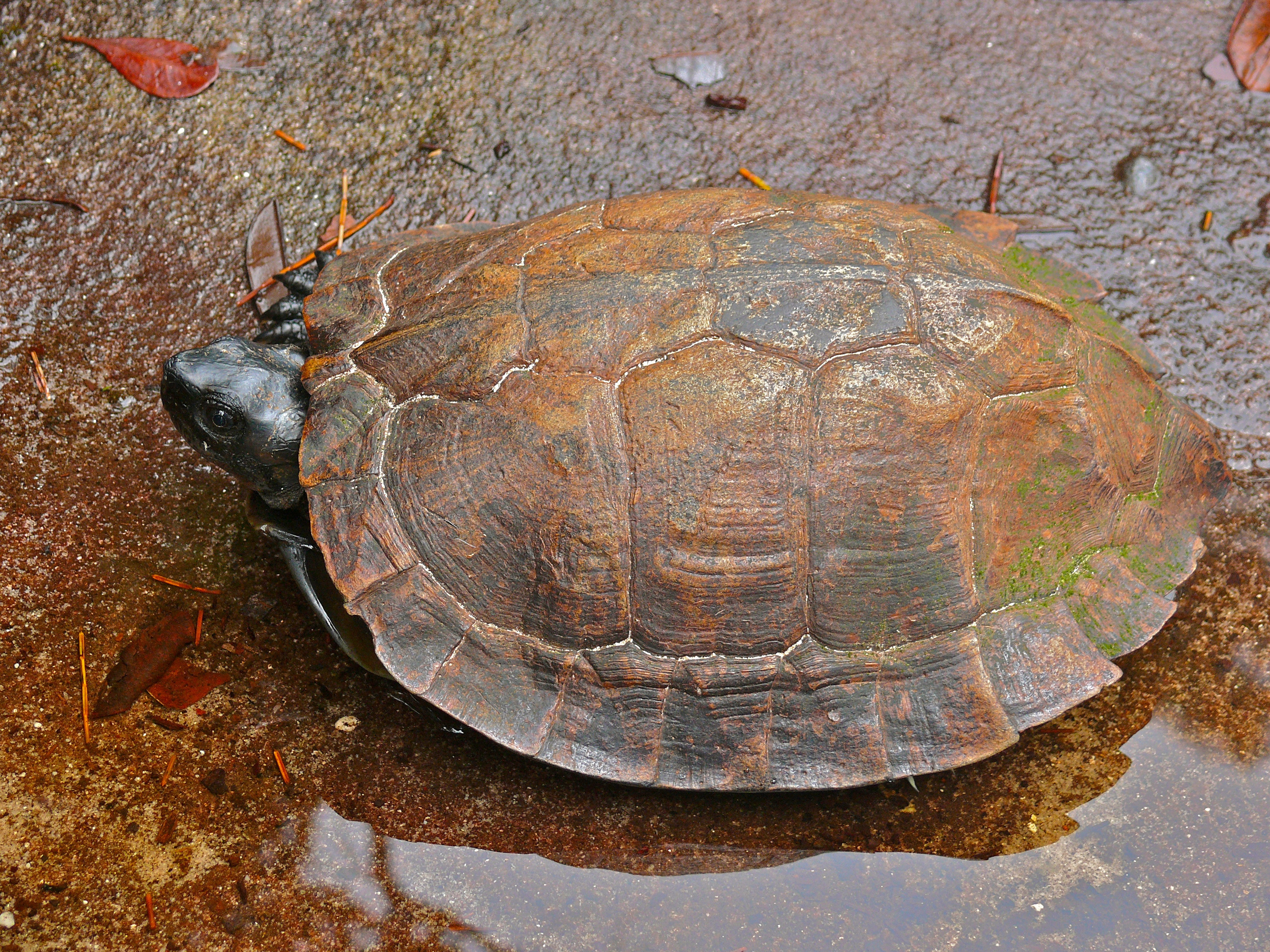

Conservation status
- Endangered (IUCN 3.1)
- CITES Appendix II

Scientific classification
- Kingdom: Animalia
- Phylum: Chordata
- Class: Reptilia
- Order: Testudines
- Suborder: Cryptodira
- Family: Geoemydidae
- Genus: Heosemys
- Species: H. spinosa

Binomial name
- Heosemys spinosa (Gray, 1830)

Synonyms
- Emys spinosae Gray, 1830; Geoemyda spinosa Gray, 1834; Clemmys (Clemmys) spinosa Fitzinger, 1835; Heosemys spinosa Stejneger, 1902

= Spiny turtle =

Species of turtle

The spiny turtle (Heosemys spinosa) is a South-East Asian turtle species. It inhabits lowland and hill rainforest, usually dwelling in the vicinity of small streams in hill areas up to 1,000 m above sea level. It is found in Brunei, Indonesia, Malaysia, Myanmar, India, the Philippines, Singapore, and Thailand.

== Description ==
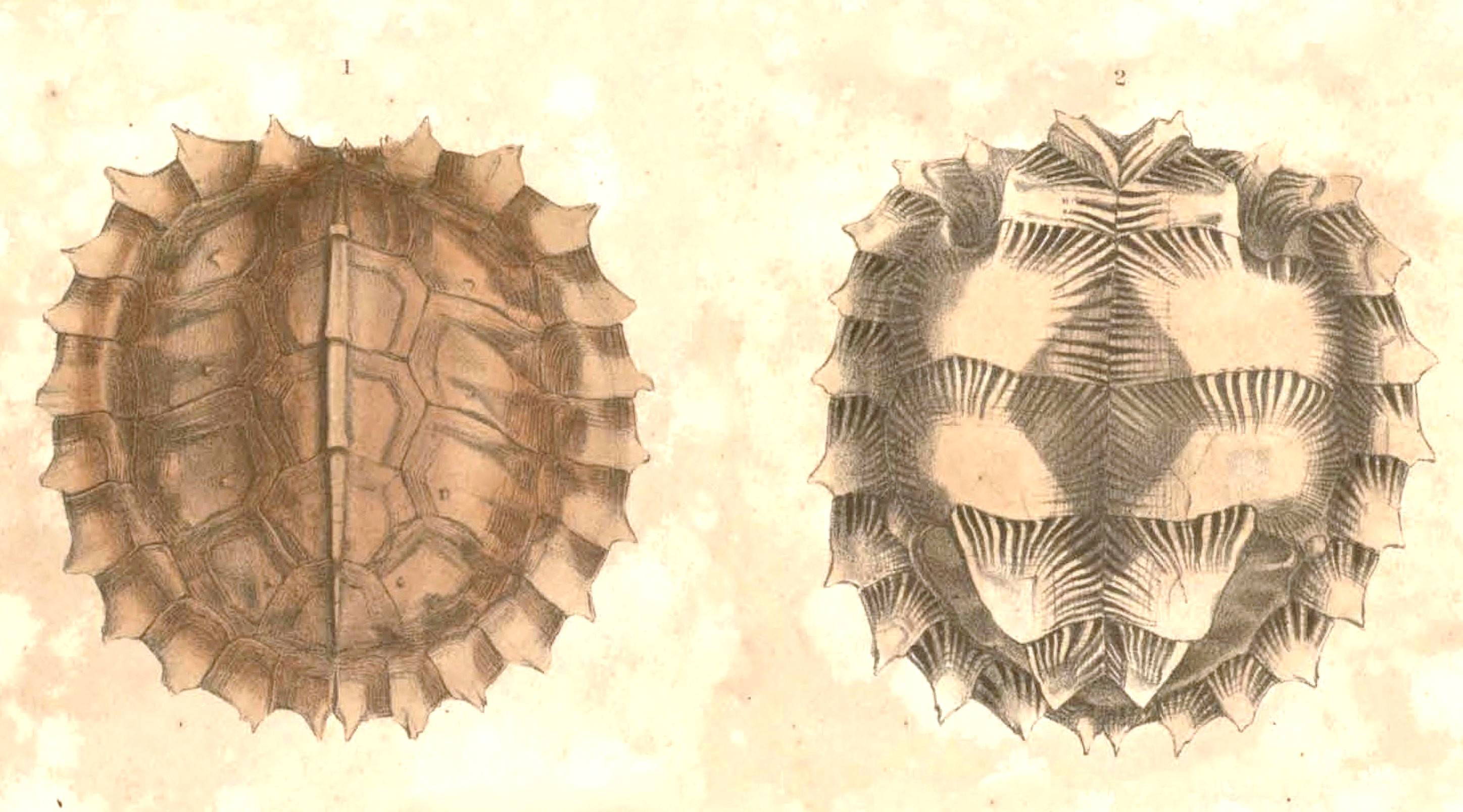
Carapace

The spiny turtle is a medium-sized turtle with a brown shell and red-spotted head. Also known as the "cog-wheel turtle," it derives its name from its spiky-edged carapace, marginal scutes, and spiny keel. As juvenile spiny turtles become adults, the black striped and yellow underside of their shell fades in color. In addition, the juveniles' serrations, or jagged edges, at the carapace margin decrease in size and become restricted to the carapace's rear margin. These changes of the spine and carapace serve as evolutionary adaptations attempting to prevent predators from preying on juvenile turtles.

== Taxonomy ==
The spiny turtle belongs to the kingdom of Animalia, the order of Testudines, and the genus of Heosemys. The classification of Heosemys incorporates four species: Heosemys annandalii, Heosemys depressa, Heosemys grandis, and Heosemys spinosa; however, relationships between the four are undetermined. Variation among the Heosemys spinosa is also uncertain, but it has been suggested that there are two types: a "mainland form" dwelling in Malaysia, Thailand, and southern Myanmar, and an "insular form" found in Indonesia and the Philippines, possibly in Brunei and Singapore as well.

== Anatomy ==
Adult spiny turtles' carapace length usually falls between 175 mm to 220 mm and their mass ranges from 1.5 kg to 2.0 kg.

== Behavior ==
The spiny turtle buries itself in leaf litter to camouflage during the day and only emerges at night, foraging for food.

While often portrayed as a herbivore, the spiny turtle also eats carrion and insects alongside fruits and plants. Fruit from the yin-ngan tree is especially important for the turtle, and in Myanmar, the turtle often dwells beneath these trees when the trees are fruiting. Similarly, captive juvenile spiny turtles consume fruit salads multiple times a week, particularly those containing tomatoes. At the Kubah National Park in Sarawak, analysis of fecal content revealed the turtles' role as seed dispersal agents, for their fecal matter contained five different seed types. Arthropods and hair were also found in the samples, suggesting consumption of mammals and other animals.

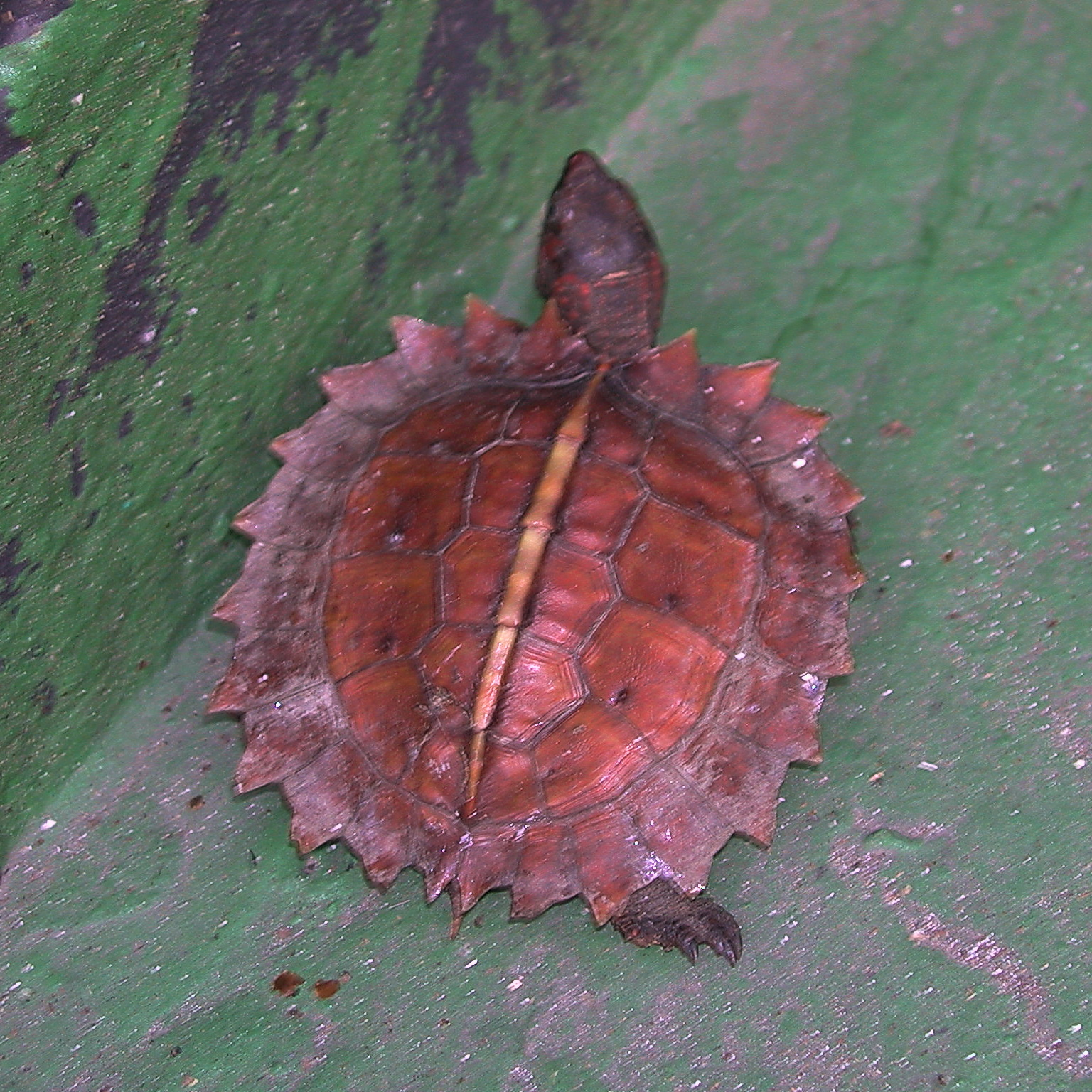
young spiny turtle

== Reproduction ==
Mating occurs in December and February, and appears to be triggered by rain. Regarding nesting behavior in the wild, the female lays one or two eggs in a nest and produces up to three clutches annually.

In captivity, it has been observed that spraying males with water results in them chasing females and attempting to mount. To ease the delivery of the egg, a hinge forms in the female turtle's plastron before it is laid. The egg is usually covered with a partial layer of substrate, and researchers have found eggs laid in a so-called "protected spot" underneath cork bark or thick foliage.

Many attempts at reproduction in captivity have proved unsuccessful due to the eggs' shells being thick and prone to bursting if the substrate is too damp. The first successful copulation in captivity occurred in 1991 at Zoo Atlanta, where incubation lasted for 106 days in a medium of peat moss, long fiber peat moss, and damp sand. For the first 35 days, the egg was incubated at a temperature of 28-30°C, and for the last 71 days, the temperature was decreased to 26-28°C.

== Distribution ==
The spiny turtle is known from Brunei, Indonesia, Malaysia, Myanmar, the Philippines, Singapore, and Thailand. It lives along brooks in forested areas, usually in mountains with altitudes of 170 m to 1,000 m above sea level.

== Conservation ==
Labeled as "vulnerable" by the IUCN in 1996, the spiny turtle became endangered in 2000 when the supply of the species declined by a half in the Chinese food market. It is suggested that the main threat to the spiny turtle has been the destruction of natural forests to create oil palm plantations, common in southern Myanmar. The spiny turtle's participation in the international pet trade and its use in traditional Chinese medicine has also led to its decline. However, numerous conservation efforts have been undertaken because the turtle is protected by the Philippines Wildlife Act and other initiatives. A spiny turtle hatching at the Chester Zoo in the UK in 2013 has also given hope to conservationists that the species may be retained.
