= Friedrich Siebenrock =

Austrian herpetologist

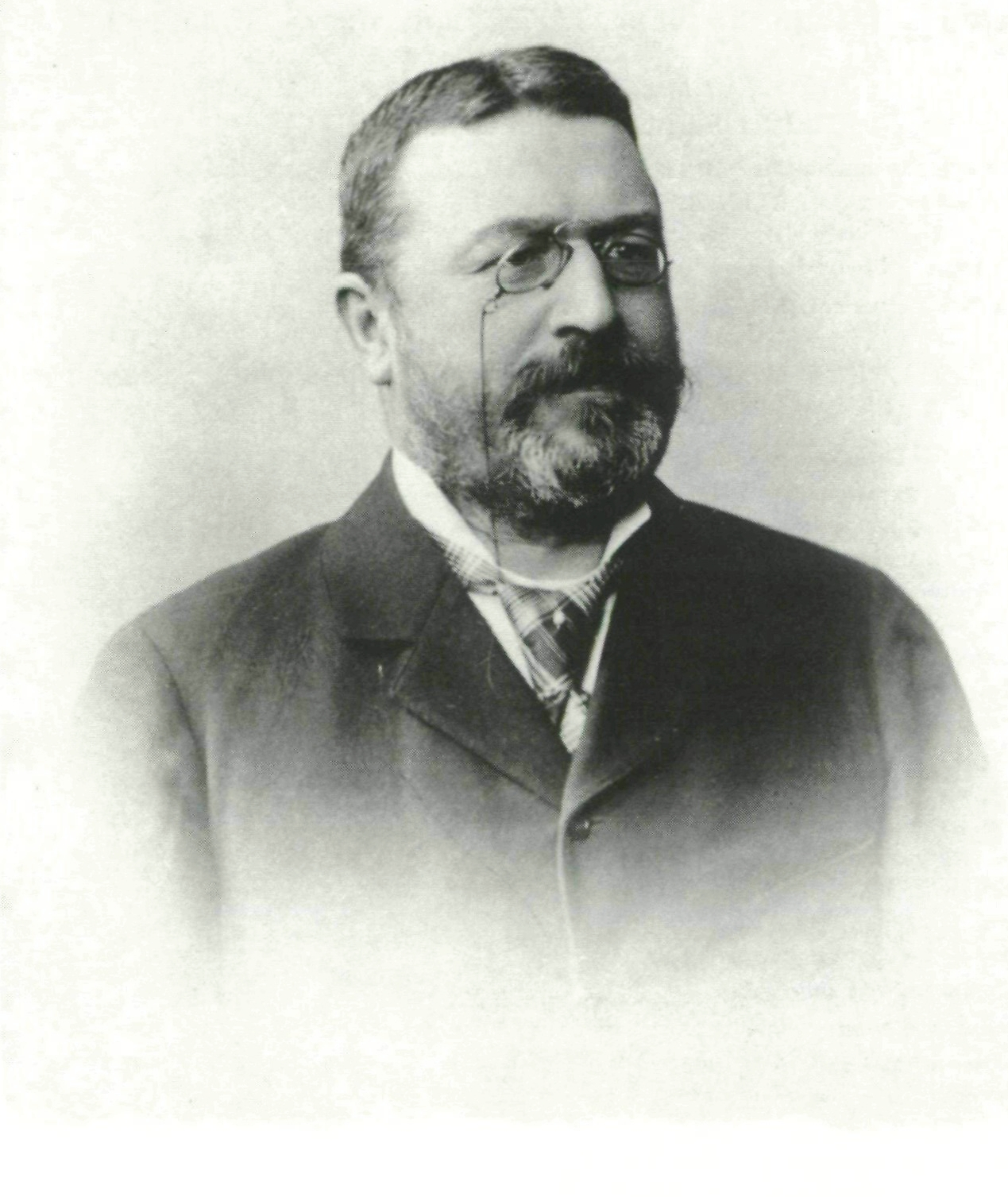
Friedrich Siebenrock

Friedrich Siebenrock (20 January 1853, Schörfling am Attersee – 28 January 1925, Vienna) was an Austrian herpetologist.

== Biography ==
He studied zoology at the Universities of Innsbruck and Vienna, afterwards serving as a demonstrator under Carl Brühl at the zootomical institute in Vienna. In 1886, he began work as a volunteer at the Naturhistorisches Museum, where he would subsequently spend the remainder of his career. In 1919 he succeeded Franz Steindachner as curator of the amphibian and reptile section at the museum.

His primary scientific research was dedicated to turtles, publishing a number of works on their morphology and systematics. Through his endeavors, the museum's herpetological collection contained a skeleton collection that was considered to be world-renowned. At the museum, he worked on specimens collected by Viktor Pietschmann in Mesopotamia and Kurdistan; on Alfred Voeltzkow's zoological collections from East Africa, on Rudolf Grauer's Belgian Congo collections and with Steindachner's herpetological specimens from Brazil.

In 1895 and 1897, he accompanied Steindachner on the Ersten und Zweiten Österreichischen Expedition nach dem Roten Meer (First and Second Austrian Expeditions to the Red Sea).

== Eponymy ==
- "Black marsh turtle", Siebenrockiella crassicollis
- "Philippine forest turtle", Siebenrockiella leytensis
- "Siebenrock's snake-necked turtle", Chelodina siebenrocki F. Werner, 1901 = Chelodina rugosa Gray, 1841
- "Siebenrock's longtail lizard", Latastia siebenrocki (Tornier, 1905)
- "Siebenrock's Caspian turtle", Mauremys caspica siebenrocki Wischuf & Fritz, 1997

== Works ==
- Ergebnisse einer zoologischen Forschungsreise von Dr. Franz Werner nach Ägypten und im ägyptischen Sudan. IV Krokodile und Schildkröten, in: Sitzungsberichte der kaiserlichen Akademie der Wissenschaften Wien, Mathematisch-naturwissenschaftliche Klasse, Bd. 115 (1906), S. 817-839.
- Die Schildkröten Niederösterreichs vor der Eiszeit in: Blätter für Naturkunde und Naturschutz Niederösterreichs, Wien 1916; 3(4): 1-7.
- Ueber Wirbelassimilation bei den Sauriern (PDF-Datei; 4,36 MB)

== Biography ==
- Franz Tiedemann und Heinz Grillitsch: Friedrich Siebenrock 1853–1925. In: HERPETOZOA 1 (3/4): 109–118, Wien, 25. Februar 1989 Digitalisat hier
- V. Stagl: "Siebenrock Friedrich". In: Österreichisches Biographisches Lexikon 1815–1950 (ÖBL). Vol. 12, Austrian Academy of Sciences, Vienna 2005, ISBN 3-7001-3580-7, p. 226.
