= Sulawesi forest turtle =

Conservation status
- Critically Endangered (IUCN 3.1)
- CITES Appendix II

Scientific classification
- Kingdom: Animalia
- Phylum: Chordata
- Class: Reptilia
- Order: Testudines
- Suborder: Cryptodira
- Family: Geoemydidae
- Subfamily: Geoemydinae
- Genus: Leucocephalon; McCord, Iverson, Spinks & Shaffer, 2000
- Species: L. yuwonoi

Binomial name
- Leucocephalon yuwonoi (McCord, Iverson & Boeadi, 1995)

Synonyms
- Geoemyda yuwonoi McCord, Iverson & Boeadi, 1995; Heosemys yuwonoi — Fritz & Obst, 1996; Leucocephalon yuwonoi — McCord, Iverson, Spinks & Shaffer, 2000; Notochelys yuwonoi — Artner, 2008; Leucocephalon yuwonoi — TTWG, 2014

Species of turtle

The Sulawesi forest turtle (Leucocephalon yuwonoi) is a critically endangered species of turtle in the family Geoemydidae. The species is monotypic within the genus Leucocephalon. It is endemic to Sulawesi in Indonesia. These turtles have a unique clutch size, which is 1 or 2 eggs per clutch, that is significantly less than an average turtle's clutch size.

== Etymology ==
The specific name, yuwonoi, is in honor of Indonesian herpetologist Frank Bambang Yuwono (born 1958).

== Habitat ==
The preferred natural habitats of L. yuwonoi are freshwater swamps and rivers. They also prefer a heavily covered area rather than a more open area. They like broadleaf canopy cover and deeper ground cover.

== Conservation ==
Conservation methods are very important with species, due to very low numbers in this species and with people destroying their habitats for agriculture purposes. As of 2016 The Riverview Zoo in Peterborough, Ontario, had managed to hatch two Sulawesi forest turtles. As of 2022, there are only a few captive populations where we have been able to gain an understanding of Sulawesi forest turtles.

== See also ==
- Forsten's tortoise (Indotestudo forstenii) – another threatened turtle endemic to Sulawesi, Indonesia.
