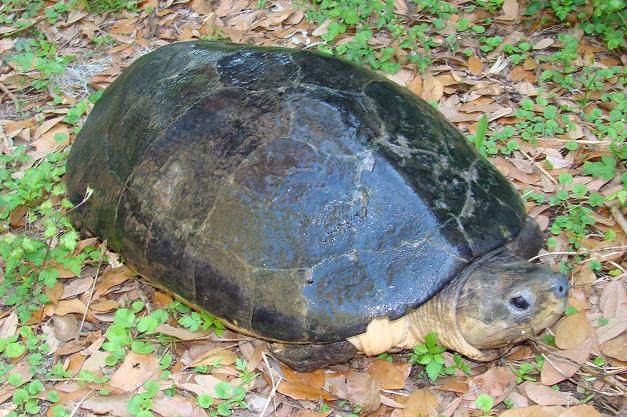
- A Malaysian giant turtle

Scientific classification
- Domain: Eukaryota
- Kingdom: Animalia
- Phylum: Chordata
- Class: Reptilia
- Order: Testudines
- Suborder: Cryptodira
- Superfamily: Testudinoidea
- Family: Geoemydidae
- Subfamily: Geoemydinae

Genera
- See text

= Geoemydinae =

Subfamily of turtles

The Geoemydinae are a subfamily of turtles consisting of 60 subspecies and 76 taxa.

These genera are placed here:

- Batagur (six species, including part of Kachuga)
- Chinemys (three species) (sometimes included in Mauremys)
- Cuora (10-11 species) (including Cistoclemmys)
- Cyclemys (seven species)
- Geoemyda (two species)
- Hardella (monotypic)
- Heosemys (formerly in Geoemyda)
- Hieremys (formerly in Geoemyda, often included in Heosemys)
- Leucocephalon (monotypic) (formerly in Geoemyda and Heosemys)
- Malayemys (two species)
- Mauremys (including Annamemys, Cathaiemys and Emmenia)
- Melanochelys
- Morenia (two species)
- Notochelys
- Ocadia (monotypic), historic genera included in Mauremys
- Orlitia (monotypic)
- Pangshura (four species)
- Pyxidea (monotypic) (often included in Cuora)
- Sacalia (two species)
- Siebenrockiella (two species) (formerly in Geoemyda and Heosemys, includes Panayanemys)
- Vijayachelys (monotypic) (formerly in Geoemyda and Heosemys)

== Bibliography ==
- Rhodin, Anders G.J.; van Dijk, Peter Paul; Inverson, John B.; Shaffer, H. Bradley; Roger, Bour (2012-12-31). "Turtles of the world, 2012 update: Annotated checklist of taxonomy, synonymy, distribution and conservation status" (PDF). Chelonian Research Monographs. 5. doi:10.3854/crm.5.000.checklist.v5.2012. ISBN 978-0965354097. Archived from the original (PDF) on 2013-06-16.
- Geoemydidae
