= Terrapin =

Several species of small turtle living in fresh or brackish water

Terrapins or water tortoises are a group of several species of aquatic reptile of the order Testudines living primarily in fresh or brackish tidal waters, and having the clawed feet of tortoises rather than the flippers of marine turtles. In American English, they are referred to as marsh, pond, or tide-water turtles, with some species called pond sliders as well. Whereas tortoises are almost strict herbivores and frugivores — largely feeding on flowers, grasses, leaves, and fallen fruit — a great many terrapins are mainly carnivorous — largely feeding on amphibians, arthropods, freshwater fish, and molluscs — though some are herbivores. Terrapins are identified primarily with the taxonomic family Emydidae, but do not form a single taxon and may not be closely related, with some belonging to the families Geoemydidae, Pelomedusidae, Podocnemididae, and Chelydridae. Though primarily aquatic, terrapins do relatively frequently come to land for many reasons, but particularly to warm up by basking in the sun.

== Etymology ==
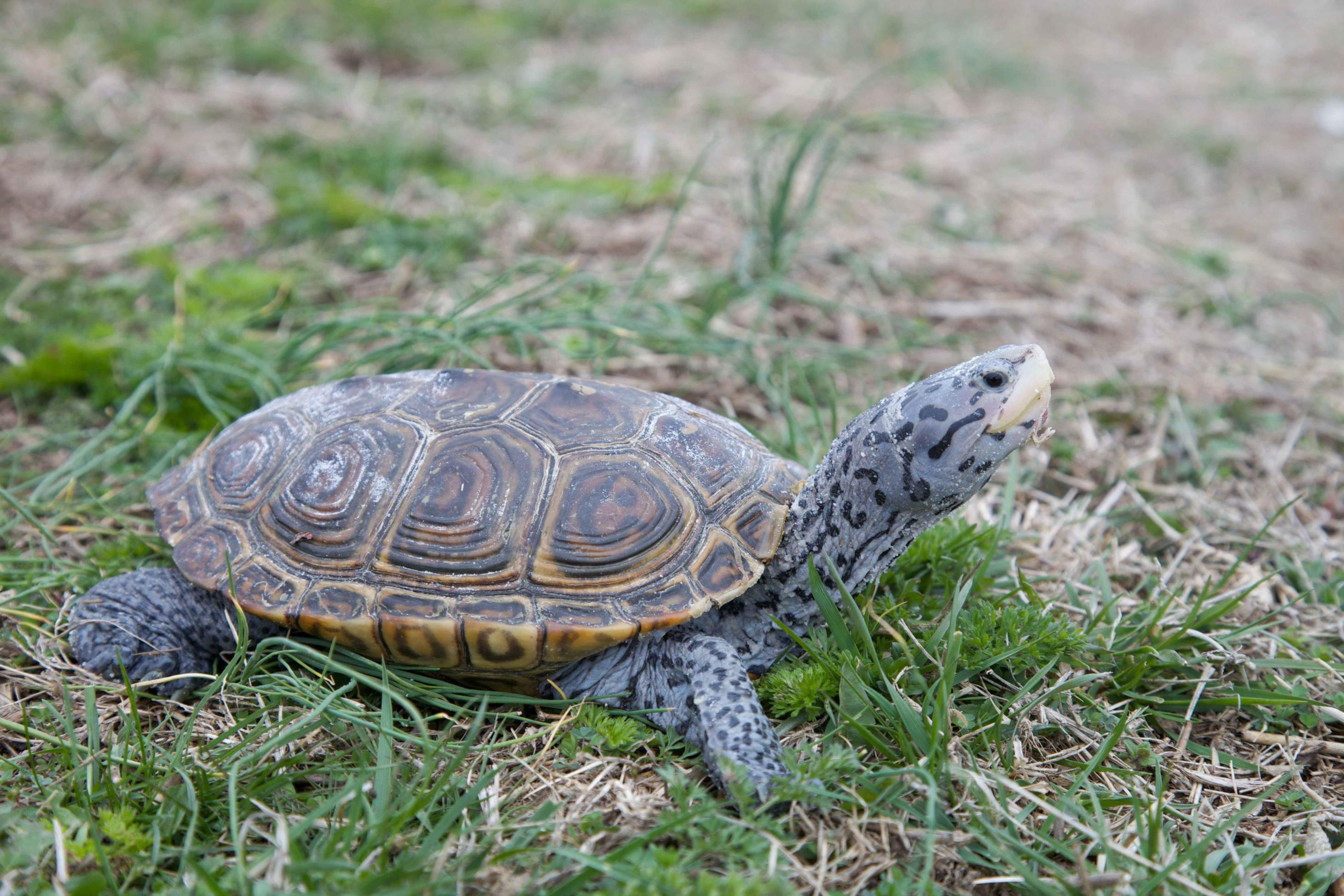
Diamondback terrapin

The name "terrapin" is derived from the word in the Algonquian languages: torope that referred to the species Malaclemys terrapin, the diamondback terrapin. It appears that the term became part of common usage during the colonial era of North America and was carried back to Great Britain. Since then, it has been used in common names for freshwater species of Testudines in the English language, but is not as widely used in North America.

Terrapins gave their name to a colloquialism for the War of 1812 — 'the Terrapin War' — because, through the blockade, the United States was shut up tight in its shell like a terrapin against the British forces.

== Species ==
The International Union for Conservation of Nature (IUCN) Red List of Threatened Species — also known as the 'IUCN Red List' or 'Red Data Book' — inventory of the global conservation status and extinction risk of biological species, place most species terrapins as "threatened with extinction" — between vulnerable species and critically endangered.

Terrapin species include:

Family	Genus	Species (subspecies)	common name	Native natural habitat range	IUCN Red List status	Current population trend	Notes
Chelydridae	Chelydra	acutirostris	South American snapping turtle	South America			(W. Peters, 1862)
Chelydridae	Chelydra	rossignonii	Central American snapping turtle; Mexican snapping turtle; Yucatán snapping turtle	Central America	VU^{IUCN}		(Bocourt, 1868)
Chelydridae	Chelydra	serpentina	common snapping turtle	southeastern Canada; United States; eastern US; southeastern US	LC^{IUCN}		(Linnaeus, 1758)
Chelydridae	Macrochelys	temminckii	alligator snapping turtle	United States; Florida Panhandle; western Illinois; southern Indiana; southeastern Iowa; southeast Kansas; western Kentucky; Louisiana; west Michigan; Missouri; western Tennessee; east Texas	EN^{IUCN}		a pet in the exotic animal trade that often grows too large and exceeds the abilities for owners to care for and has become an seriously destructive invasive species in many places across central and southern Europe and South Africa
Emydidae	Actinemys	marmorata	western pond turtle	western United States; Mexico	VU^{IUCN}		
Emydidae	Clemmys	guttata	spotted turtle	southern Canada; Ontario; eastern United States; the eastern Great Lakes; east of the Appalachian Mountains	EN^{IUCN}		
Emydidae	Emydoidea	blandingii	Blanding's turtle	North American Great Lakes; parts of the US Great Plains; New England coastal lands	EN^{IUCN}	decreasing	
Emydidae	Emys	orbicularis	European pond terrapin	central Europe; parts of northern Africa; western Asia	NT^{IUCN}		
Emydidae	Glyptemys	muhlenbergii	bog turtle	eastern United States	CR^{IUCN}		
Emydidae	Glyptemys	insculpta	wood turtle	northeastern United States	EN^{IUCN}		
Emydidae	Malaclemys	terrapin	diamondback terrapin	North America; Bermuda	VU^{IUCN}		
Emydidae	Trachemys	scripta (elegans)	red-eared slider; red-eared terrapin	southern United States; northern Mexico			a popular pet and an invasive species in many places
Emydidae	Trachemys	scripta (scripta)	yellow-bellied slider; yellow-bellied terrapin	southeastern United States; Florida; southeastern Virginia	LC^{IUCN}		a popular pet and an invasive species in many places
Geoemydidae	Batagur	affinis	southern river terrapin	southeast Asia; Cambodia; Indonesia; Malaysia	CR^{IUCN}		
Geoemydidae	Batagur	baska	northern river terrapin	Cambodia	CR^{IUCN}		
Geoemydidae	Batagur	borneoensis	painted terrapin	southeast Asia; Brunei; Indonesia; Malaysia; Thailand	CR^{IUCN}		
Geoemydidae	Batagur	dhongoka	three-striped roofed turtle	south Asia	CR^{IUCN}		
Geoemydidae	Batagur	kachuga	red-crowned roofed turtle	south Asia	CR^{IUCN}		
Geoemydidae	Batagur	trivittata	Burmese roofed turtle	Myanmar	CR^{IUCN}		
Geoemydidae (Bataguridae)	Mauremys	caspica	Caspian turtle; striped-neck terrapin	western Asia; Caspian Sea; Azerbaijan; Georgia; Iran; Turkey; eastern Mediterranean	NA^{IUCN}		
Geoemydidae (Bataguridae)	Mauremys	leprosa	Spanish pond turtle; Iberian pond turtle; Mediterranean pond turtle	Iberia; Portugal; Spain; northern Africa; Morocco; Algeria; Tunisia	VU^{IUCN}		
Geoemydidae (Bataguridae)	Mauremys	mustica	yellow pond turtle	eastern Asia; coastal China: Zhejiang; Fujian; Guangdong; Hainan; Vietnam; Taiwan	CR^{IUCN}	decreasing	inhabits ponds, creeks, swamps, marshes, and other bodies of shallow, slow-moving water; omnivorous, feeding on insects, fish, tadpoles, and vegetable matter such as leaves and seeds
Geoemydidae	Mauremys	rivulata	Balkan terrapin; western Caspian turtle	The Balkans; Croatia; Montenegro; Albania; Greece; Bulgaria; Turkey; Cyprus	LC^{IUCN}		
Geoemydidae	Melanochelys	trijuga	Indian pond terrapin; Indian black turtle	south Asia; India			
Geoemydidae	Morenia	ocellata	Bengal eyed terrapin; Burmese eyed turtle; Burmese peacock turtle	Myanmar; Yunnan, China			
Geoemydidae	Rhinoclemmys	rubida	Mexican spotted terrapin; Mexican spotted wood turtle	Mexico			
Geoemydidae	Siebenrockiella	crassicollis	black marsh turtle; smiling terrapin	southeast Asia	EN^{IUCN}		
Pelomedusidae	Pelusios	castaneus	West African mud turtle; swamp terrapin	central Africa; western Africa	LC^{IUCN}		
Pelomedusidae	Pelusios	seychellensis	Seychelles mud turtle	The Seychelles	EX^{IUCN}		
Pelomedusidae	Pelusios	sinuatus	serrated hinged terrapin	southern Africa	LC^{IUCN}		
Pelomedusidae	Pelusios	subniger	black-bellied hinged terrapin	central Africa; western Africa	LC^{IUCN}		
Platysternidae	Platysternon	megacephalum	big-headed turtle	southeast Asia; Cambodia; China; Laos; Myanmar; Thailand; Vietnam	CR^{IUCN}		
Podocnemididae	Erymnochelys	madagascariensis	Madagascan big-headed turtle	Madagascar	CR^{IUCN}		

1994 IUCN Red List categories (ver. 2.3) for species not reassessed since 2001

== Conventions ==
IUCN Red List categories
Conservation status
- EX: Extinct (1 species)
- EW: Extinct in the wild (0 species)
- CR: Critically endangered (10 species)
- EN: Endangered (5 species)
- VU: Vulnerable (4 species)
- NT: Near threatened (1 species)
- LC: Least concern (5 species)

Other categories
- DD: Data deficient (0 species)
- NE: Not evaluated (0 species)

Conservation status codes listed follow the International Union for Conservation of Nature (IUCN) Red List of Threatened Species. Range maps are provided wherever possible; if a range map is not available, a description of the range is provided. Ranges are based on the IUCN Red List for that species unless otherwise noted. All extinct species or subspecies listed alongside extant species went extinct after 1500 CE, and are indicated by a dagger symbol "†".

== See also ==
- Reptilia
  - Crocodilia
  - Rhynchocephalia
  - Squamata
  - Testudine
    - Tortoise
    - Turtle
- Wildlife conservation
- Conservation status
- CITES
- The International Union for Conservation of Nature (IUCN)
  - IUCN Red List
  - Category:Species by IUCN Red List category
