= Kalyar Platt =

Burmese herpetologist and conservationist

- Born: 1972 (age 52–53); Rangoon, Myanmar
- Education: Yangon University (BSc, MSc); Chulalongkorn University (PhD)
- Awards: Behler Turtle Conservation Award (2015)
- Scientific career
- Fields: Herpetology
- Institutions: Wildlife Conservation Society

Kalyar Platt (born 1972) is a Burmese herpetologist and turtle conservationist. She is the director of the Myanmar Program of the Turtle Survival Alliance and oversees conservation, breeding and reintroduction projects for some of Southeast Asia's rarest turtle species. She formerly worked for Wildlife Conservation Society and earned her PhD from Bangkok's Chulalongkorn University in 2007.

== Early life and education ==
Kalyar was born in 1972 in Yangon, Myanmar, to U Nyunt Thein and Daw San San. Her father was a government engineer involved in the construction of hydroelectric dams. She accompanied him to work sites where she witnessed construction workers collecting turtles in pits. She was fascinated by the variety of species but recoiled in horror when the turtles were pulled from the pit, butchered and cooked by the camp chef.

She earned her B.Sc. with honours from Yangon University in 1995. She earned her M.Sc. from the same university in 2000. Fearing that the Burmese military junta would close the universities, she moved to Bangkok in 2001. Platt earned her PhD in 2007 from Chulalongkorn University in Bangkok. She studied the ecology of the Southern river terrapin (Batagur affinis) under the biologist Kumthorn Thirakhupt. She then moved to the United States with her husband and lived briefly in Alpine, Texas before moving to New York. She lived with her sisters and worked at an orchid farm.

== Career ==
Platt started her conservation career at the Wildlife Conservation Society in Thailand in 2001. She said that her decision to work in wildlife conservation was influenced by the career of primatologist Jane Goodall.

Platt led a study in the Tanintharyi Region of Myanmar in 2008 concerning local beliefs towards the critically endangered Northern river terrapin (Batagur baska) and found that the people had "strong, highly localised beliefs that these animals have spiritual powers, including the ability to transform into humans." The study found a hesitation to disturb or harvest the turtles due to the belief that they are under the protection of spirits known as nats.

In 2009, she was part of a team of scientists that, after nearly a decade of searching, rediscovered a population of wild specimens of the critically endangered Arakan forest turtle (Heosemys depressa) in the Rakhine Yoma Elephant Range in the Arakan Mountains of Myanmar. Efforts to conserve the Arakan forest turtle have been limited due to instability in the region. According to Platt, "Although we have been educating the public about the Arakan tortoise, we are not able to carry out conservation and education activities as before due to political instability".

In 2010, Platt was hired to be the Director of the Myanmar Program of the Turtle Survival Alliance. Platt oversees conservation, breeding and reintroduction projects for some of Southeast Asia's rarest turtle species. One of her earliest conservation efforts involved organising a national conservation workshop for the Burmese star tortoise (Geochelone platynota) and developing a plan detailing how and where to reintroduce the species. She re-engineered the conservation program for the tortoise, establishing a captive breeding program at Minsontaung Wildlife Sanctuary and releasing 1000 of the turtles into the wild from 2013 to 2017. Following the success of the program at the Minsontaung Wildlife Sanctuary, reintroduction programs for the tortoises were created at the Shwesettaw Wildlife Sanctuary and Lawkananda Wildlife Sanctuary. By 2018, the population of Burmese star tortoises in forest reserves had increased to 15,000.

Platt oversaw the collection of Burmese roofed turtle (Batagur trivittata) eggs at the Chindwin River. In 2015, she conducted a release of hatchlings that had been captively reared from eggs collected from wild turtles. She also established a third assurance colony for the turtles and worked with the Yadanabon Zoological Gardens in Mandalay to increase their production of hatchlings.

In late 2015, Platt travelled to Lanbi Kyun to establish the island's first turtle hatchery, train staff in hatchery management, and reassess the suitability of the island's beaches for sea turtle nests.

Platt received the Behler Turtle Conservation Award in 2015. The Assistant Director General of the Myanmar Forest Department remarked that the "TSA/WCS efforts on behalf of turtles is without exception the most effective conservation program in the country, and much of this success was due to the unceasing labors of one person, the Leik Saya Magyi, Indomitable Turtle Lady, of Myanmar, Kalyar Platt."

Platt has received grants from the National Geographic Society for her work in turtle conservation. In 2017, she received a grant for the reintroduction and conservation of the Burmese star tortoise. In 2021, she received a grant for the repatriation of confiscated big-headed turtles (Platysternon megacephalum) to protected areas.

During a presentation on World Turtle Day in 2019, Platt made an argument against releasing turtles at pagoda ponds and pleaded for people to stop the practice. (Note: Life release, the traditional Buddhist practice of saving animals destined for slaughter, is often performed at pagoda ponds by visiting pilgrims who have purchased caged turtles.)

== Personal life ==
Platt married fellow herpetologist Steven Platt in 2004.

== Selected publications ==
- Platt, Kalyar; Platt, Steven G.; Thirakhupt, Kumthorn; Rainwater, Thomas R. (December 2008). "Recent Records and Conservation Status of the Critically Endangered Mangrove Terrapin, Batagur baska, in Myanmar". Chelonian Conservation and Biology. 7 (2): 261–265. doi:10.2744/CCB-0701.1. S2CID 84454944.
- Platt, Kalyar; Platt, Steven G.; Rainwater, Thomas R. (December 2014). "First Record of the Spiny Turtle ( Heosemys spinosa ) in Myanmar". Chelonian Conservation and Biology. 13 (2): 257–260. doi:10.2744/CCB-1082.1. S2CID 84353064.
- Rhodin, Anders G.J.; et al. (18 December 2018). "Global Conservation Status of Turtles and Tortoises (Order Testudines)" (PDF). Chelonian Conservation and Biology. 17 (2): 135. Bibcode:2018CConB..17..135R. doi:10.2744/CCB-1348.1. S2CID 91937716.
- Platt, Steven G.; Naing Aung, Swann Htet; Soe, Me Me; Lwin, Tint; Platt, Kalyar (12 May 2021). "Predation on Translocated Burmese Star Tortoise (Geochelone platynota) by Asiatic Jackals (Canis aureus) and Wild Pigs (Sus scrofa) at a Wildlife Sanctuary in Myanmar". Chelonian Conservation and Biology. 20 (1). doi:10.2744/CCB-1461.1. S2CID 235599007.
- Platt, Kalyar; Lin, Naing; Myo, Khin; Platt, Steven; Nwe, San; Yu, Thin; Khaing, Lay; Naing, Thet. (2022). "Birds of the Chindwin River and adjacent areas of the Chin and Naga Hills in western Myanmar." 33. 64–76.
