= Kachuga =

Kachuga (roofed turtles) is an obsolete genus formerly used for several species of Asian turtles, now placed in Batagur and Pangshura:

- Batagur dhongoka – three-striped roofed turtle
- Batagur kachuga – red-crowned roofed turtle
- Batagur trivittata – Burmese roofed turtle
- Pangshura smithii – brown roofed turtle
- Pangshura sylhetensis – Assam roofed turtle
- Pangshura tecta – Indian roofed turtle
- Pangshura tentoria – Indian tent turtle
