= National Chambal Sanctuary =

Wildlife sanctuary in India

- National Chambal Gharial Wildlife Sanctuary
- IUCN category IV (habitat/species management area)
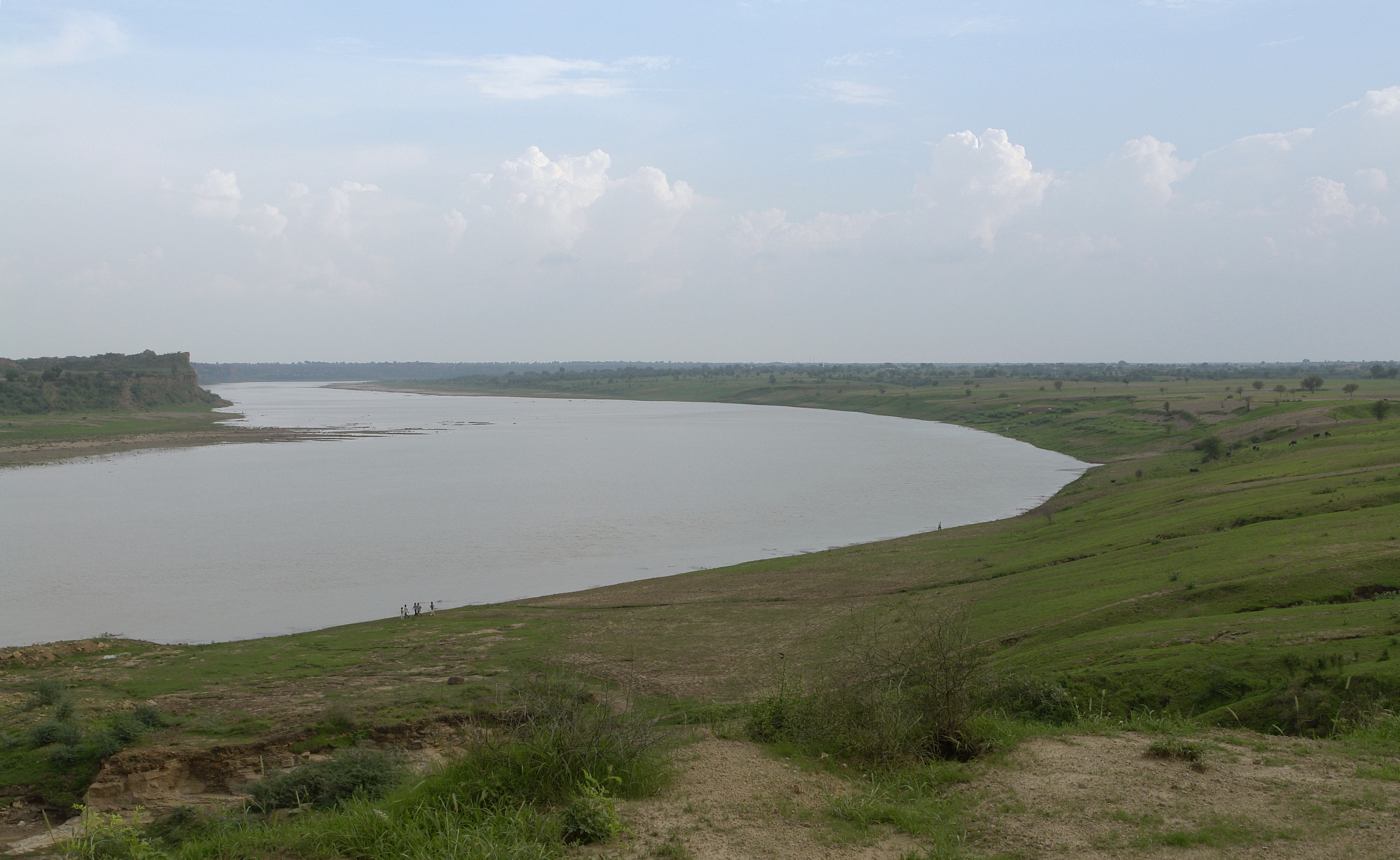
- National Chambal Sanctuary near Dhaulpur

- Location within Madhya Pradesh Location within India
- Interactive map of National Chambal Sanctuary
- Location: Madhya Pradesh, India
- Nearest city: Morena 30 km (19 mi), Agra 70 km (43 mi), Etawah 50 km (31 mi)
- Coordinates: 26°46′06″N 78°38′40″E
- Established: 1979
- Governing body: Uttar Pradesh Forest Department
- Website: https://nationalchambalsanctuary.in/

National Chambal Sanctuary, also called the National Chambal Gharial Wildlife Sanctuary, is a 5,400 km^{2} (2,100 sq mi) tri-state protected area in northern India for the protection of the Critically Endangered gharial, the red-crowned roof turtle and the Endangered Ganges river dolphin. Located on the Chambal River near the tripoint of Rajasthan, Madhya Pradesh and Uttar Pradesh, it was first declared in Madhya Pradesh in 1978, and now constitutes a long narrow eco-reserve co-administered by the three states. Within the sanctuary, the pristine Chambal River cuts through mazes of ravines and hills with many sandy beaches.

It is part of the Khathiar-Gir dry deciduous forests ecoregion.

== History ==
Administrative approval of the Government of India for the establishment of the National Chambal Sanctuary was conveyed in Order No. 17-74/77-FRY (WL) dated 30 September 1978. The Sanctuary has sanctuary status declared under Section 18(1) of the Wildlife Protection Act of 1972. Since such a declaration is carried out by individual states for territory falling within their jurisdiction, there are three separate notifications covering the National Chambal Sanctuary - the Madhya Pradesh portion was gazetted in the Government of Madhya Pradesh Notice No. F.15/5/77-10(2) dated 20 December 1978, the Uttar Pradesh portion was gazetted in the Government of Uttar Pradesh Notice No. 7835/XIV-3-103-78 dated 29 January 1979 and the Rajasthan portion was gazetted in the Government of Rajasthan Notice No.F.11(12)Rev.8/78 dated 7 December 1979.

The sanctuary is protected under India's Wildlife Protection Act of 1972. The sanctuary is administered by the Department of Forest under the Project Officer with headquarters at Morena, Madhya Pradesh.

== Fauna ==
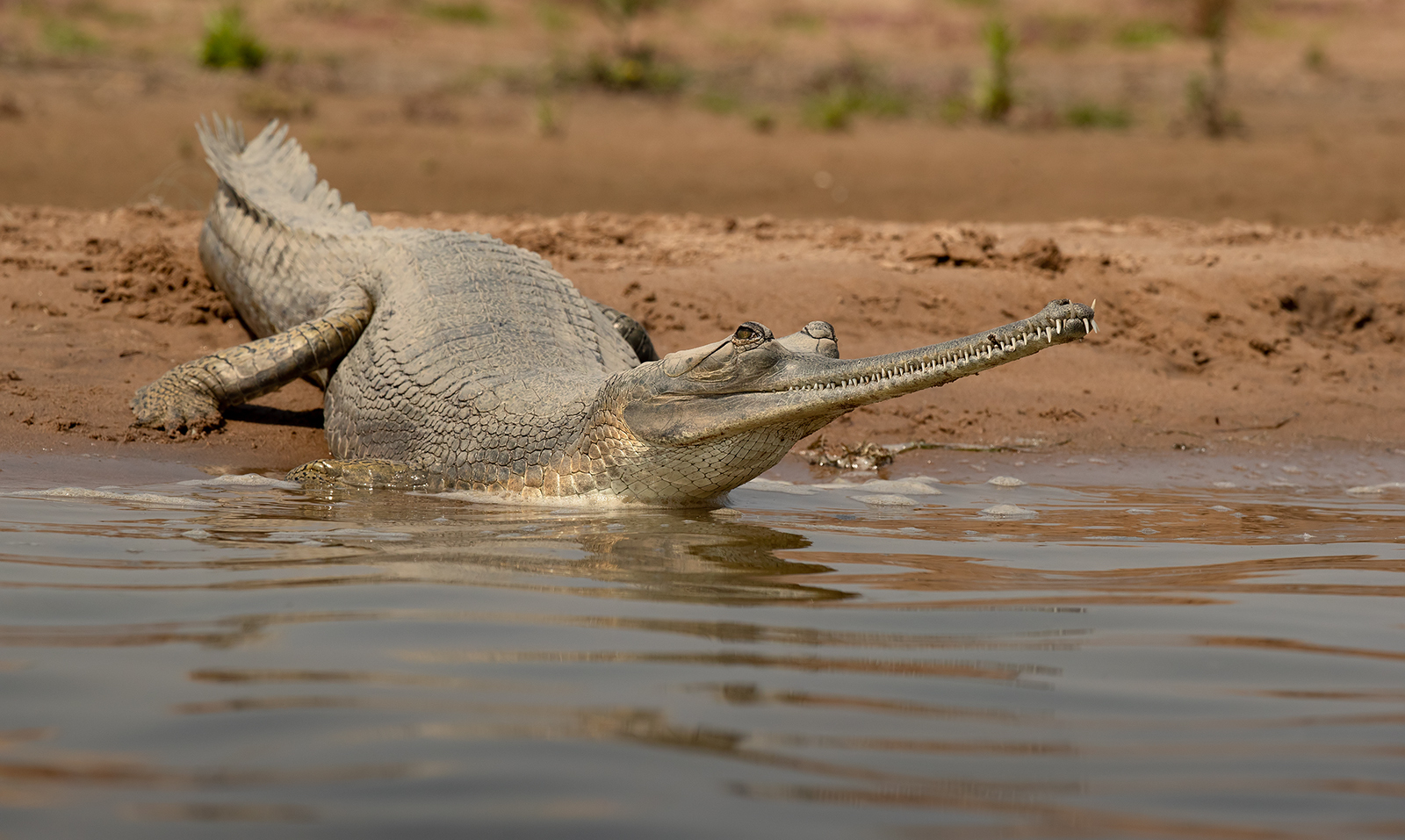
Gharial in Chambal River

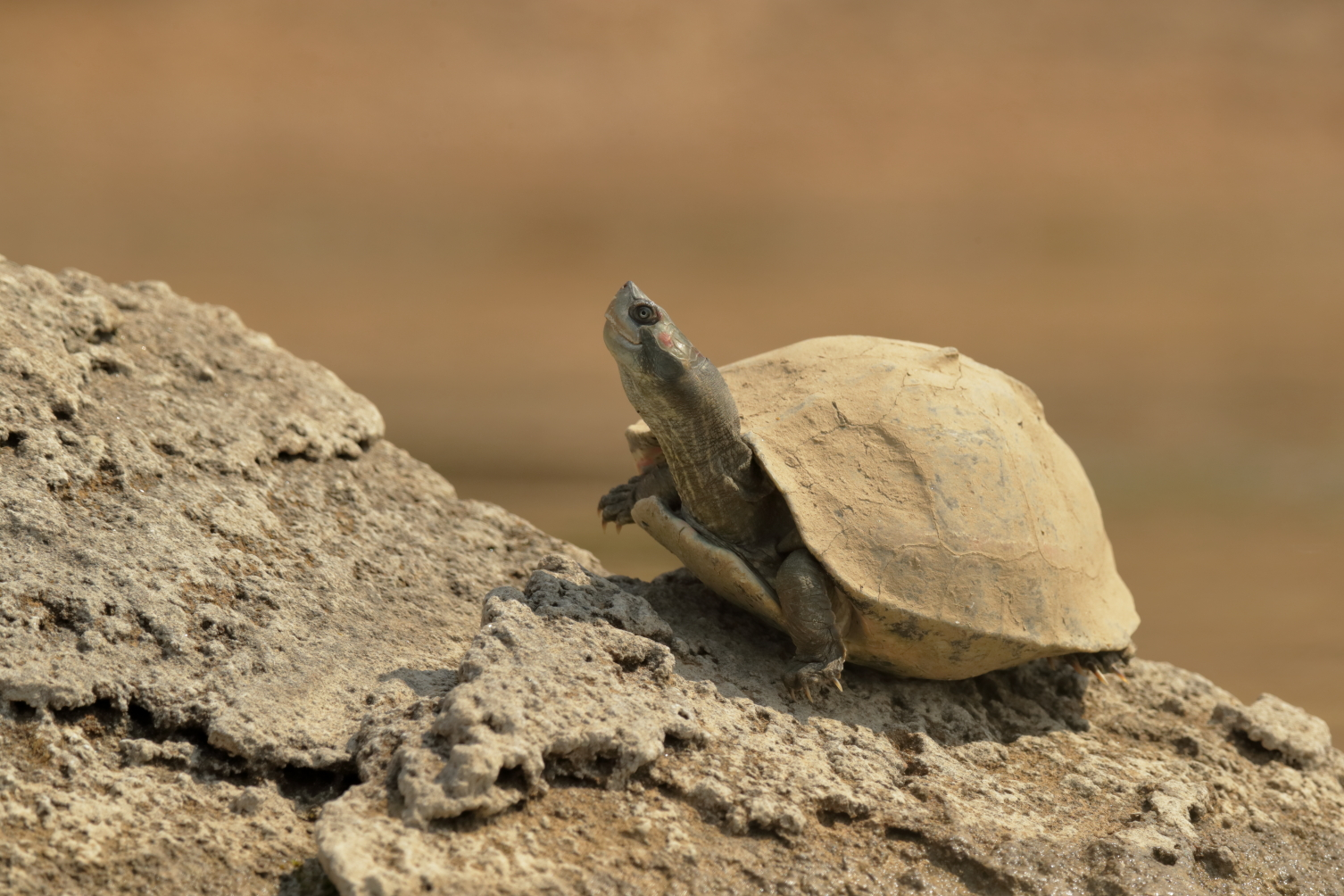
Red-crowned roof turtle in the sanctuary

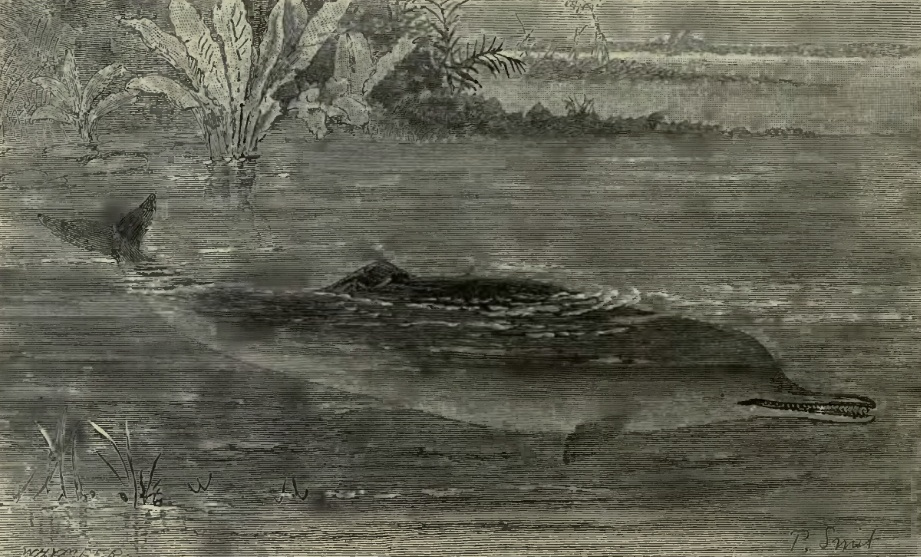
Ganges dolphin

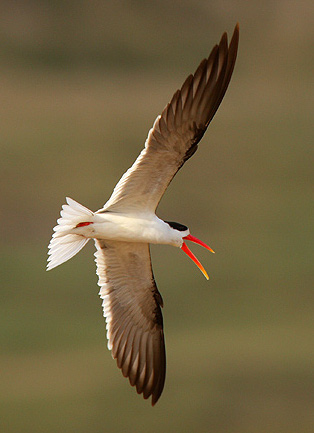
An Indian skimmer on the Chambal river

The critically endangered gharial and the red-crowned roof turtle live here, and together with the endangered Ganges river dolphin are the keystone species of the sanctuary. Other large threatened inhabitants of the sanctuary include mugger crocodile, smooth-coated otter, striped hyena and Indian wolf. Chambal supports 8 of the 26 rare turtle species found in India, including Indian narrow-headed softshell turtle, three-striped roof turtle and crowned river turtle. Other reptiles who live here are: Indian flapshell turtle, soft shell turtle, Indian roofed turtle, Indian tent turtle and monitor lizard.

Mammals of less concern which live here include: rhesus macaque, Hanuman langur, golden jackal, Bengal fox, common palm civet, small Asian mongoose, Indian grey mongoose, jungle cat, wild boar, sambar, nilgai, blackbuck, Indian gazelle, northern palm squirrel, Indian crested porcupine, Indian hare, Indian flying fox and Indian long-eared hedgehog.

The National Chambal Sanctuary is listed as an important bird area (IBA) IN122. and is a proposed Ramsar site. At least 320 species of resident and migratory birds inhabit the sanctuary. Migratory birds from Siberia form part of its rich avian fauna. Vulnerable bird species here include the Indian skimmer, sarus crane, Pallas's fish eagle and Indian courser. The pallid harrier and lesser flamingo are near threatened. Winter visitors include black-bellied tern, red-crested pochard, ferruginous pochard and bar-headed goose. Other species include great thick-knee, greater flamingo, darter, and brown boobook.

== Flora ==
Common plants in the sanctuary include khair (Acacia catechu), palash (Butea monosperma), Indian elm tree (Holoptelea integrifolia), Indian plum (Ziziphus mauritiana) and grassy patches on both sides of the river.

== Conservation management ==
The sanctuary is protected under India's Wildlife Protection Act of 1972. The sanctuary is administered by the Department of Forest under the Project Officer with headquarter at Morena, Madhya Pradesh.

Parts of the sanctuary are threatened by extensive illegal sand mining, which is endangering the fragile lotic ecosystem critical for Gharial breeding.

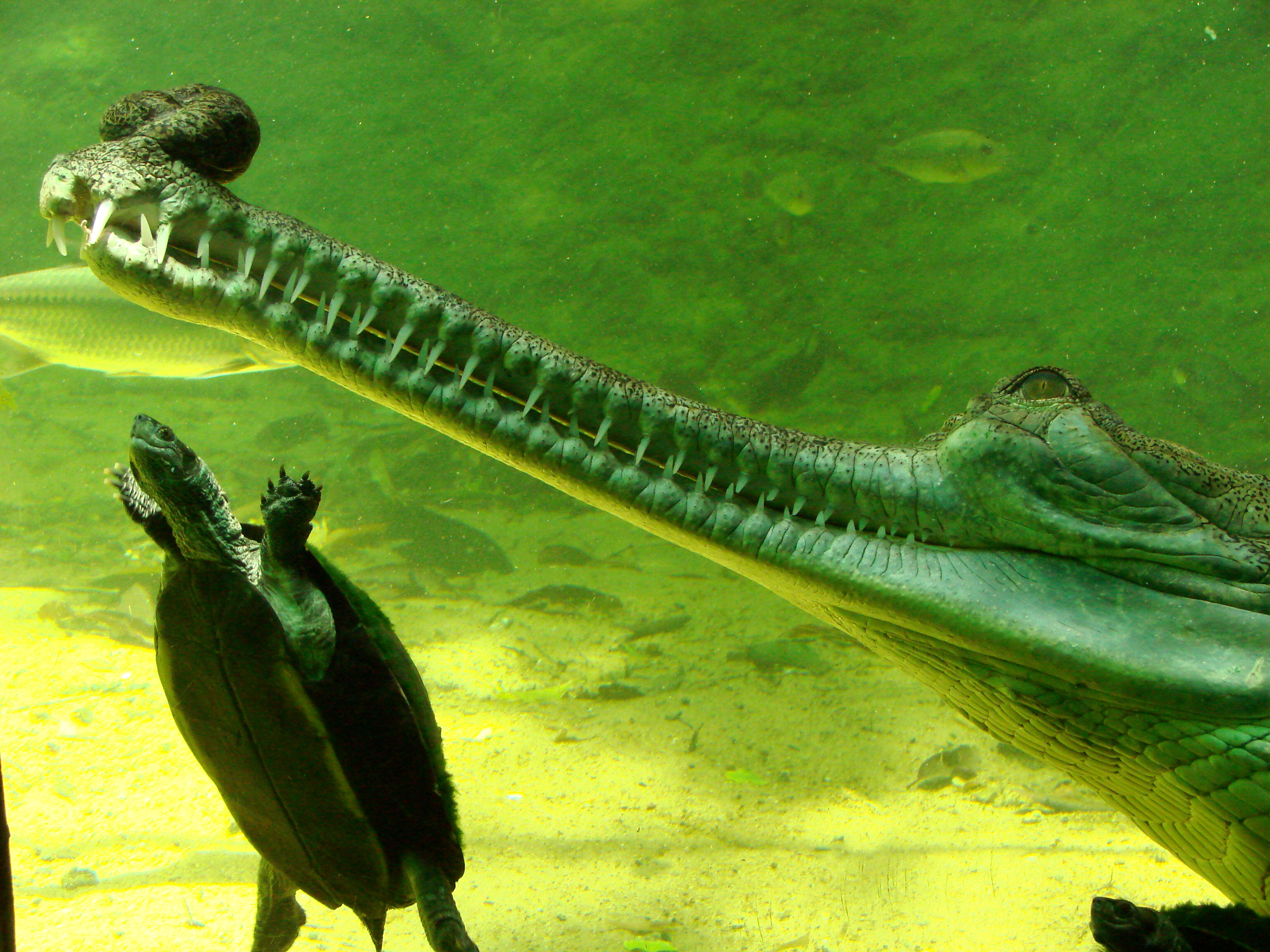
Gharial and turtles

On 27 December 2010, the Minister for Environment and Forests, Jairam Ramesh, during a visit to the Madras Crocodile Bank, announced the formation of a National Tri-State Chambal Sanctuary Management and Coordination Committee for gharial conservation on 1,600 km^{2} (620 sq mi) of the National Chambal Sanctuary. The Committee members will comprise representatives of three states' Water Resources Ministries, states' Departments of Irrigation and Power, Wildlife Institute of India, Madras Crocodile Bank, the Gharial Conservation Alliance, Development Alternatives, Ashoka Trust for Research in Ecology and the Environment, Worldwide Fund for Nature and the Divisional Forest officers of the three states. The Committee will plan strategies for protection of gharials and their habitat. It will conduct further research on the species and its ecology and evaluate the related socio-economic elements of dependent riparian communities. Funding for this new initiative will be mobilized as a sub-scheme of the ‘Integrated Development of Wildlife Habitats’ in the amount of Rs. 50 to 80 million (USD 1 million to 1.7 million) each year for five years. This project has long been advocated by herpetologist Rom Whitaker.

== Visitor activities ==
There are many nature watching opportunities available for visitors to the National Chambal Sanctuary. The best opportunities for sighting and photography of gharial and dolphins can be had by hiring a boat with a driver and guide, available at several points along the river. A boat excursion will also offer many viewpoints for photography of water and shore birds and landscapes. Walking trails in the ravines and along the river offer opportunities for close observation of the wide variety of plants and animals in the sanctuary.

There are public vehicle entry points to Chambal Sanctuary at Pinahat, Nandagon Ghat, Sehson and Bharch. Boating and visiting arrangements can be made with the help of the office of the Conservator of Forests, at Kota.

Visitors may explore Ater Fort, a beautiful but dilapidated landmark and historical site near Ater town, 35 km from Bhind. The fort was built by the Bhadauria kings Badan Singh, Maha Singh and Bakhat Singh in 1664-1698. The fort is situated on the banks of the Chambal River and can be reached by bus, jeep or boat.

There are forest rest houses at Bah and Chakkar Nagar and Public Works Department inspection bungalows at Bah and Pinahat. There are several commercial hotels and eco lodges at Agra, Etawah and Bah. The nearest airport is at Agra. The nearest railway station is at Agra. Agra and Mathura are major rail junctions with a number of trains from all over the country. Bharatpur, Ranthambhor National Park (with change at Bharatpur), Bandhavgarh National Park (Katni, Umaria) and Kanha National Park (Jabalpur) are all well serviced by the rail network from Agra.

== See also ==
- Etawah Safari Park
- Arid Forest Research Institute (AFRI)
- Darrah National Park
