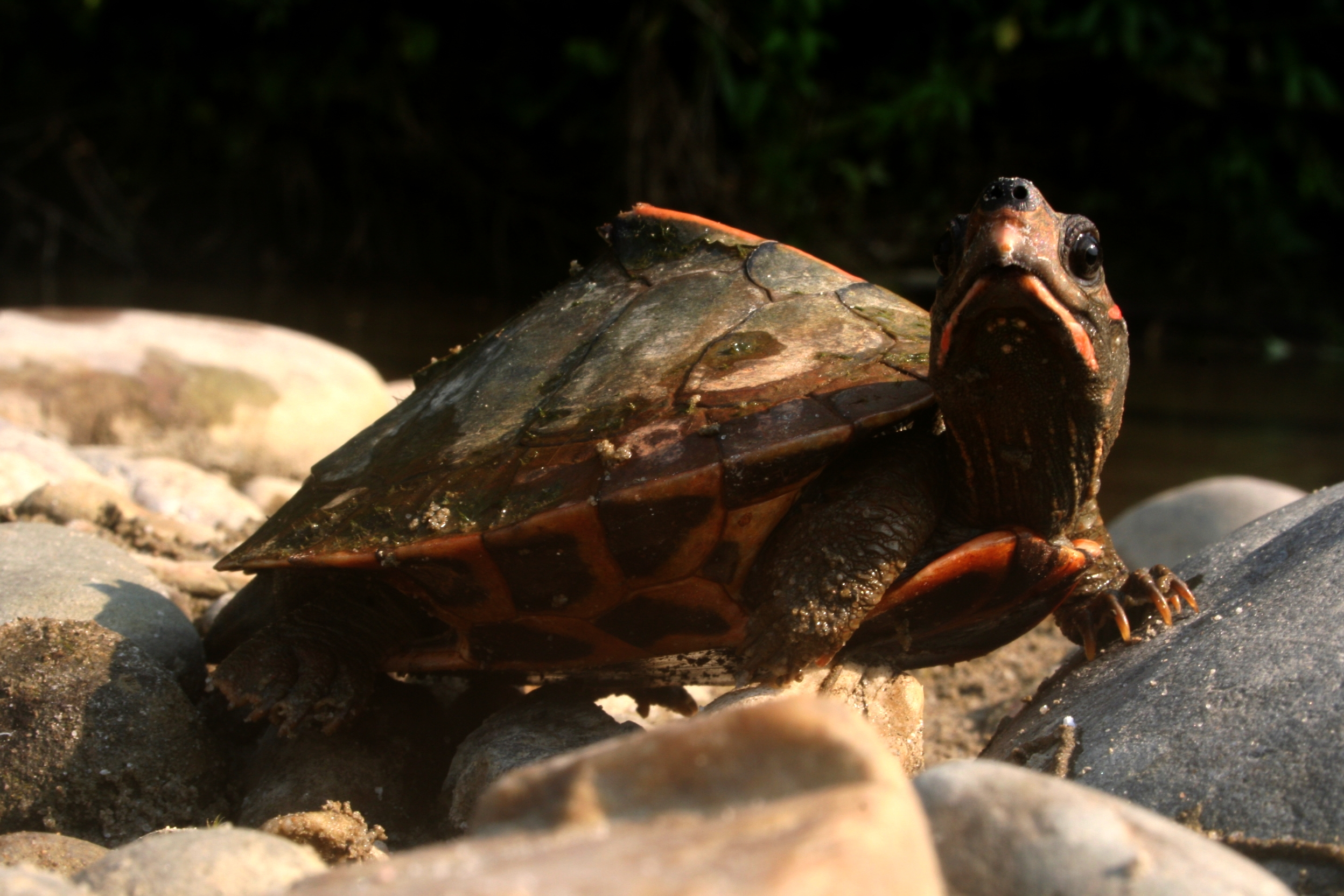

Conservation status
- Critically Endangered (IUCN 3.1)
- CITES Appendix II (CITES)

Scientific classification
- Kingdom: Animalia
- Phylum: Chordata
- Class: Reptilia
- Order: Testudines
- Suborder: Cryptodira
- Family: Geoemydidae
- Genus: Pangshura
- Species: P. sylhetensis

Binomial name
- Pangshura sylhetensis Jerdon, 1870

Synonyms
- Pangshura sylhetensis Jerdon, 1870; Jerdonella sylhetensis Gray, 1870; Kachuga sylhetensis Boulenger, 1889

= Assam roofed turtle =

Species of turtle

The Assam roofed turtle or Sylhet roofed turtle (Pangshura sylhetensis) is a turtle species of the family Geoemydidae found in the Brahmaputra-Meghna drainage in (Assam), Terai Arc Landscape region of India and parts of eastern Bangladesh (Sylhet). It was formerly placed in the genus Batagur and the defunct genus Kachuga.

== Description ==
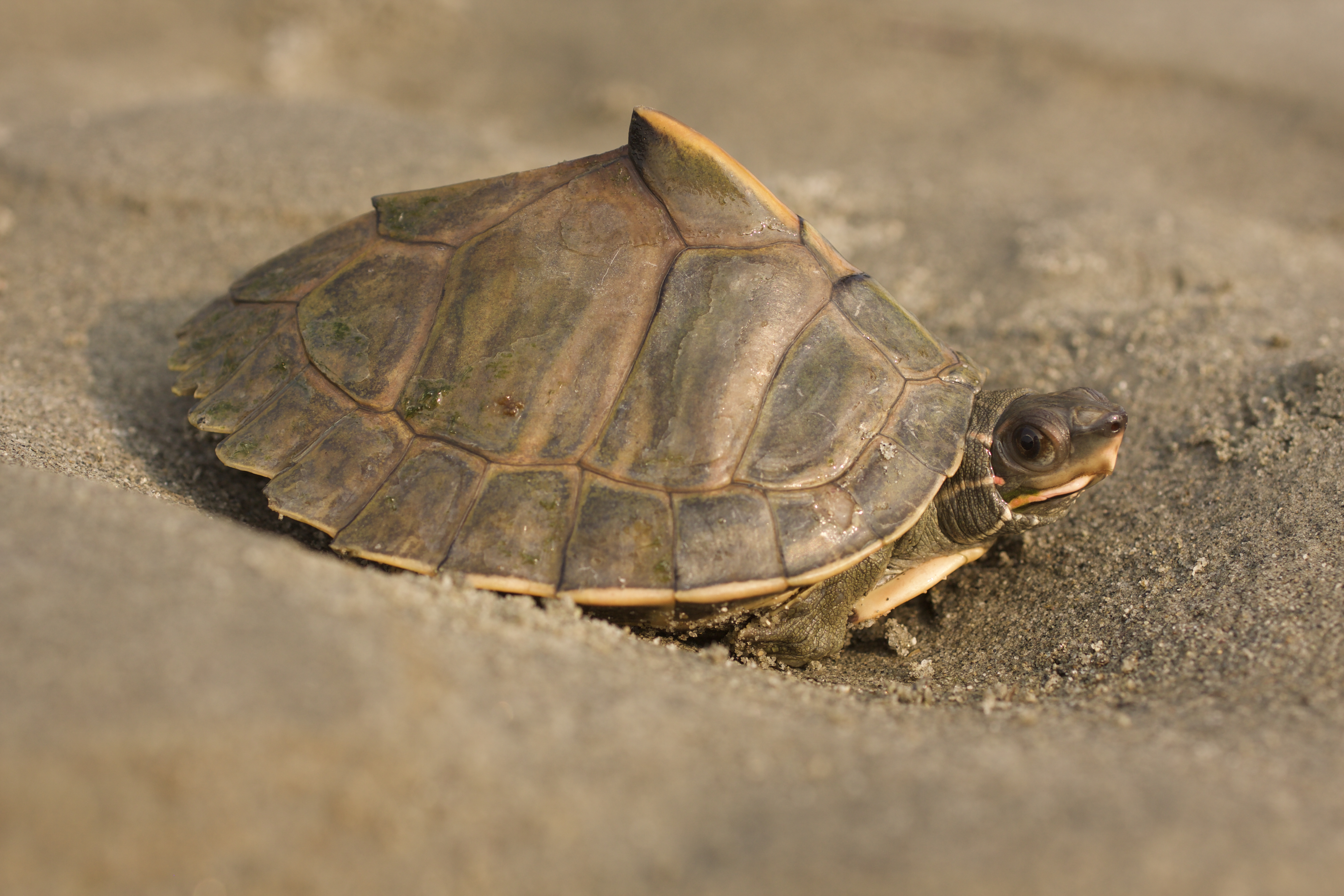
Assam, India

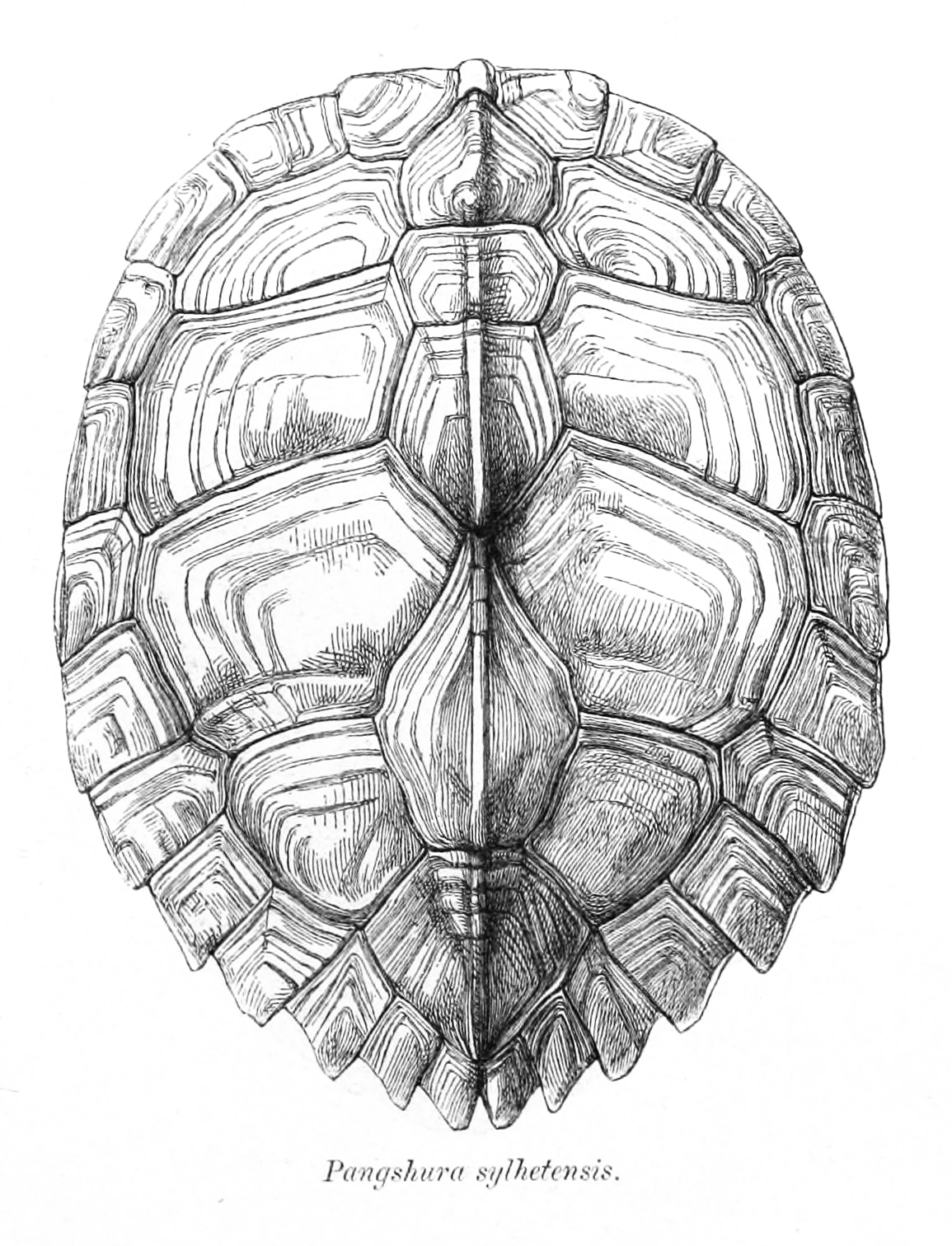
Carapace pattern

The species has a triangular and elevated carapace with a prominent spiked keel and 26 strongly serrated marginal plates. The carapace is olive brown, with a lighter (yellowish to beige) keel. The head is small and has a weakly hooked upper jaw; a narrow pink stripe runs from the back of each eye to the middle of the back of the head. Adults may attain a maximum length of 20.5 cm, although body sizes of 16 cm are more common.

The species' local names include dura kaso (দূৰা কাছ) in Assamese, śiloṭi xaṭua (ꠍꠤꠟꠐꠤ ꠇꠣꠐꠥꠀ) in Sylheti, kãṭa kachim (কাঁটা কাছিম) in Bengali.

== Distribution and habitat ==
The species occurs in the north-eastern and south-eastern parts of Bangladesh (Sylhet), in India (Assam) and possibly in Bhutan. It is found in terrestrial and freshwater habitats in areas with upland tropical moist forest, and fast-flowing streams and perhaps also small rivers. Oxbow lakes may also be inhabited, but shell morphology suggests an adaptation to fast-flowing waters.

== Ecology ==
The species is amphibious. In the cooler months of the dry season, from December to February, it basks during most of the day; individuals living in cooler hill streams may do so year round. The turtle is shy and never basks on river banks, but only on emergent logs or rocks. At the slightest disturbance, it will dive quickly to the middle of the river, hiding between rocks. Juveniles often flee into accumulations of dead leaves for camouflage and remain motionless.

== Reproduction ==
Assam roofed turtles nest between late October and February, corresponding with the cool, dry season, and produce clutches of 6 to 12 eggs. Hatchlings appear mainly between March and April, at the beginning of the southeast monsoons. The eggs need to undergo a diapause at cooler temperatures lasting between 6 and 8 weeks in order to hatch successfully.

== Conservation ==
The Assam roofed turtle is a rare species known only from a few individuals; it is believed to have one of the narrowest distributions of any south Asian geoemydid. It is exploited for its meat and eggs for local consumption and collected for the pet trade, especially in Asia where this turtle fetches high prices as pets. Habitat destruction by logging and incidental capture in fishing gear are also thought to present threats. The species is currently classified as critically endangered by the IUCN.
