= Minsontaung Wildlife Sanctuary =

Protected area in Myanmar

- IUCN category IV (habitat/species management area)
- Location within Myanmar
- Location: Myingyan District, Mandalay Division, Myanmar
- Coordinates: 21°25′00″N 95°47′00″E
- Area: 22.56 km^{2} (8.71 sq mi)
- Established: 2001
- Governing body: Forest Department

Minsontaung Wildlife Sanctuary is a protected area in Myanmar, covering 22.56 km^{2} (8.71 sq mi). It was established in 2001. It ranges in elevation from 195 to 375 m (640 to 1,230 ft) in the Natogyi Township, Mandalay Region.

As Minsontaung Wildlife Sanctuary is located in the rain shadow of the Arakan Mountains, it harbours dry forest dominated by Acacia catechu, Acacia leucophloea, Acacia arabica, Tectona hamiltoniana and Terminalia oliveri. Grasses such as Diectomis fastigata and Apluda mutica grow in open areas. The sanctuary provides habitat to the Burmese star tortoise (Geochelone platynota), which is endemic to Myanmar's dry zone.
