= Yadanabon Zoological Gardens =

Yadanabon Zoo ရတနာပုံ တိရိစ္ဆာန် ဥယျာဉ်
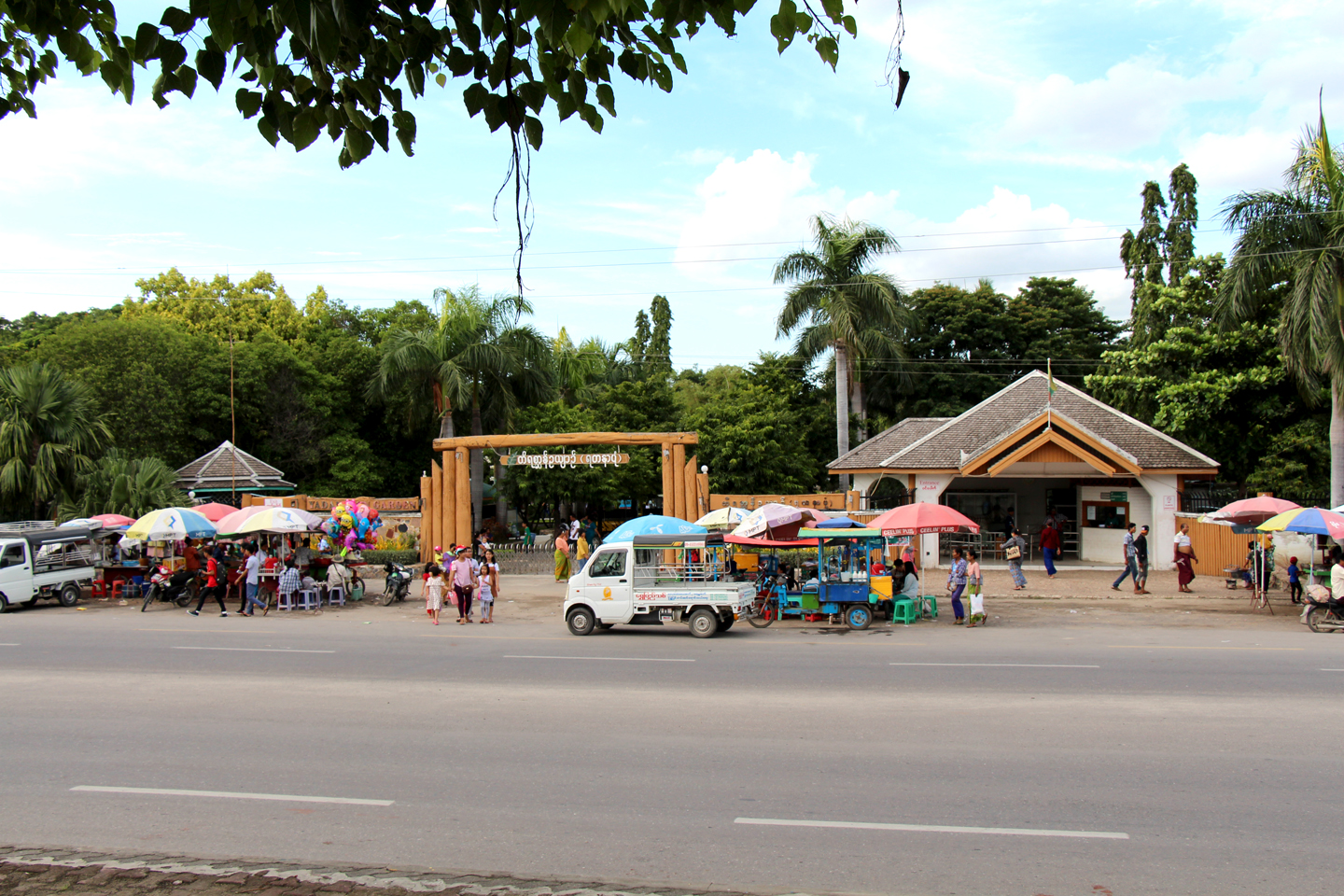
- Interactive map of Yadanabon Zoo ရတနာပုံ တိရိစ္ဆာန် ဥယျာဉ်
- 22.006°N 96.100°E
- Date opened: 1989
- Location: Mandalay; Mandalay Division, Myanmar
- Land area: 55 acres (0.22 km^{2})
- No. of animals: 300 (2003)
- Major exhibits: Burmese roofed turtle, Burmese star tortoise

The Yadanabon Zoological Gardens (Burmese: ရတနာပုံ တိရိစ္ဆာန် ဥယျာဉ် [jədənàbòʊɰ̃ təɹeɪʔsʰàɰ̃ ʔṵjɪ̀ɰ̃]) is a zoo in Mandalay, Myanmar. The zoo has nearly 300 animals, including tigers, leopards and elephants, and plays a major part in the conservation program for the highly threatened Burmese roofed turtle (Batagur trivittata).

According to a March 2011 report by a Yangon-based news magazine, the zoo reportedly is under consideration for privatization.

== History ==
The zoo is located at the foot of Mandalay Hill and opened on 8 April 1989. In 2003, its facilities were upgraded for K500 million (approximately US$500K). Part of the upgrade program included a dedicated enclosure for the K. trivittata turtle with a larger ground pond, built with emergency funds donated by BTG Studios of Sydney and Allwetterzoo Münster of Germany.

== Burmese roofed turtle ==
Yadanabon Zoo is notable for playing a significant part in the successful conservation program with the Turtle Survival Alliance for the Burmese roofed turtle (Batagur trivittata). Feared extinct until 2002, and still very rare in the wild, several hundred individuals are now kept at the zoo and a turtle conservation center at Lawkananda Park, Bagan. Yadanabon Zoo also participate in the breeding program of the highly threatened Burmese star tortoise (G. platynota).

== Photos ==
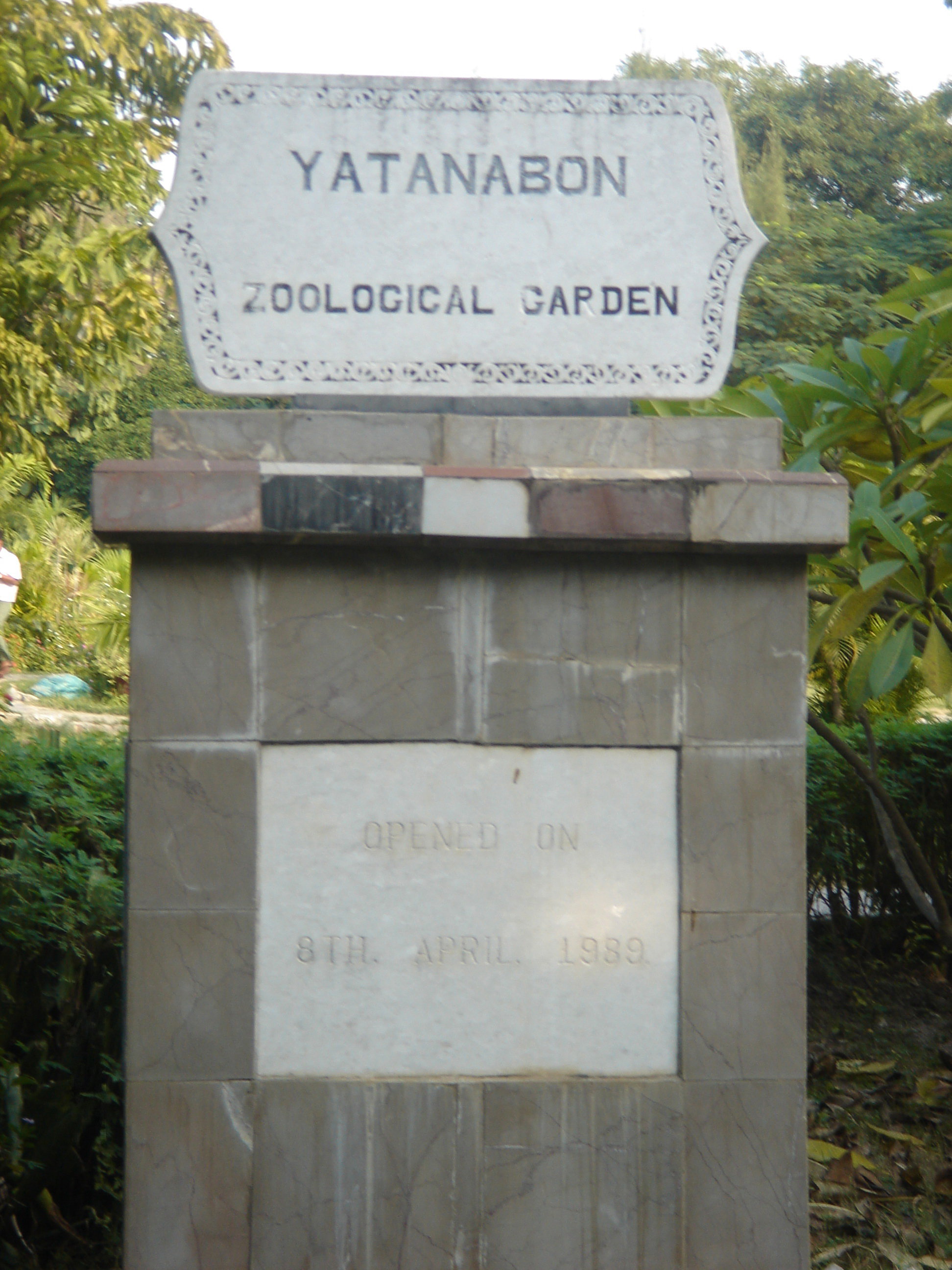
Yadanabon Zoo

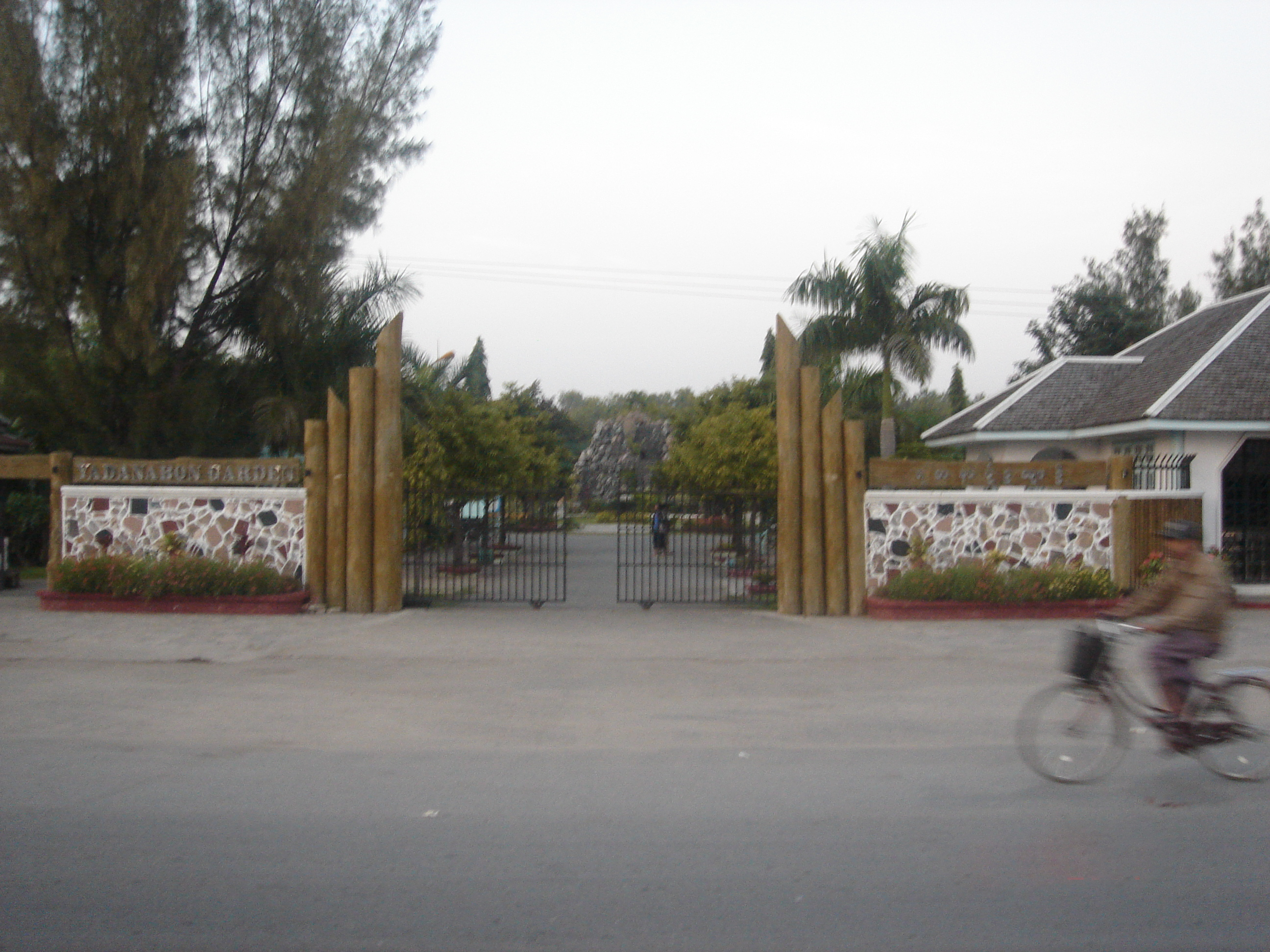
Zoo entrance
