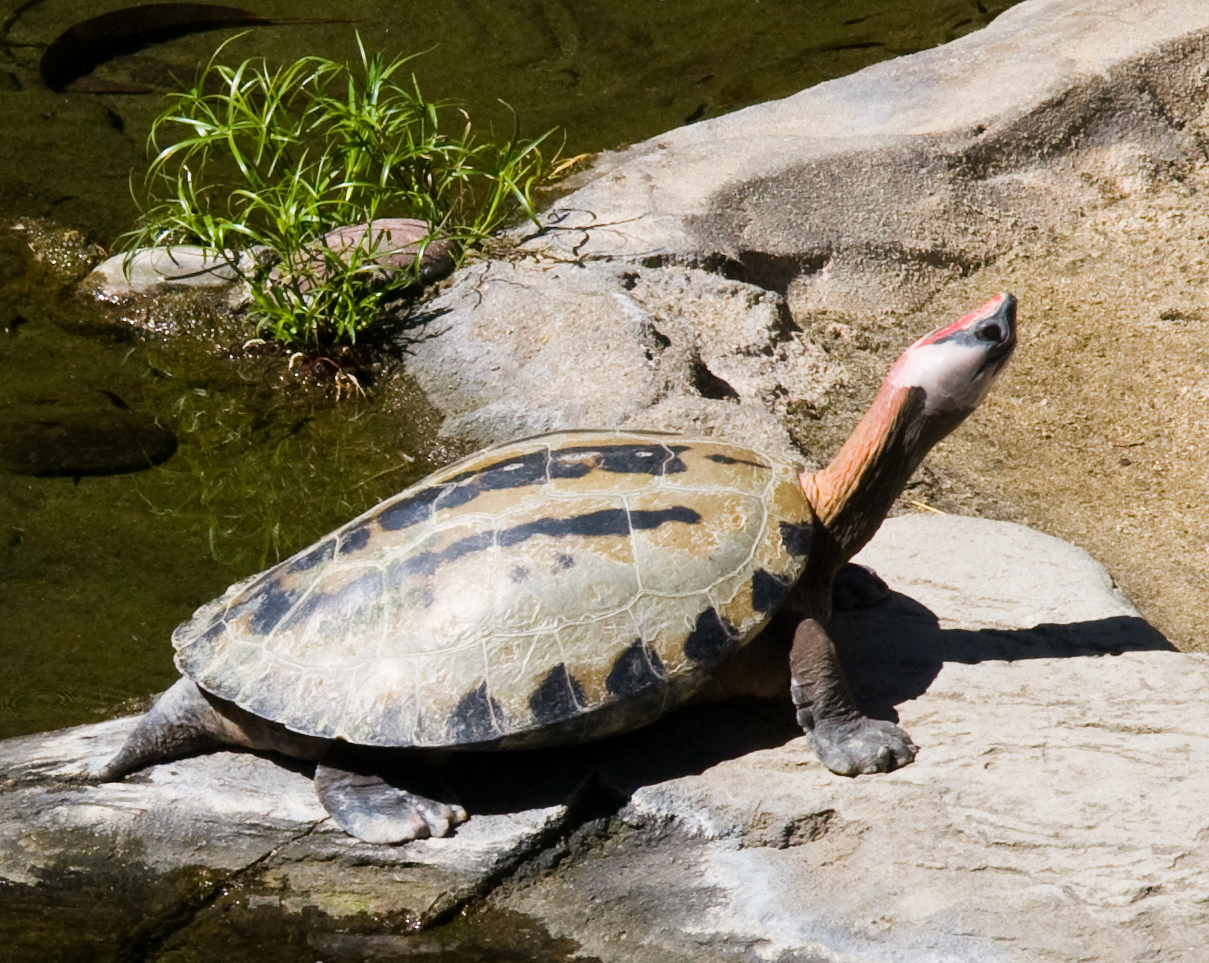
- Male, at the San Diego Zoo

Conservation status
- Critically Endangered (IUCN 3.1)
- CITES Appendix II

Scientific classification
- Kingdom: Animalia
- Phylum: Chordata
- Class: Reptilia
- Order: Testudines
- Suborder: Cryptodira
- Family: Geoemydidae
- Genus: Batagur
- Species: B. borneoensis

Binomial name
- Batagur borneoensis (Schlegel & Muller, 1844)

Synonyms
- Emys borneoensis Schlegel & Müller, 1845; Tetraonyx affinis Cantor, 1847; Batagur picta Gray, 1862; Clemmys borneoensis Strauch, 1862; Clemmys grayi Strauch, 1865; Callagur picta Gray, 1870; Cantorella affinis Gray, 1870; Kachuga major Gray, 1873; Tetraonyx pictus Theobald, 1876; Batagur borneensis Hubrecht, 1881 (ex errore); Kachuga brookei Bartlett, 1895; Callagur borneoensis Smith, 1930; Callagur pictus Pritchard, 1967

= Painted terrapin =

Species of turtle

The painted terrapin, painted batagur, or saw-jawed turtle (Batagur borneoensis) is a species of turtles in the family Geoemydidae. It was formerly in its own genus, Callagur, but has been reclassified to the genus, Batagur.

== Distribution ==
It is distributed in the rainforest of Brunei, Indonesia (Sumatra and Kalimantan), Malaysia, and Thailand.

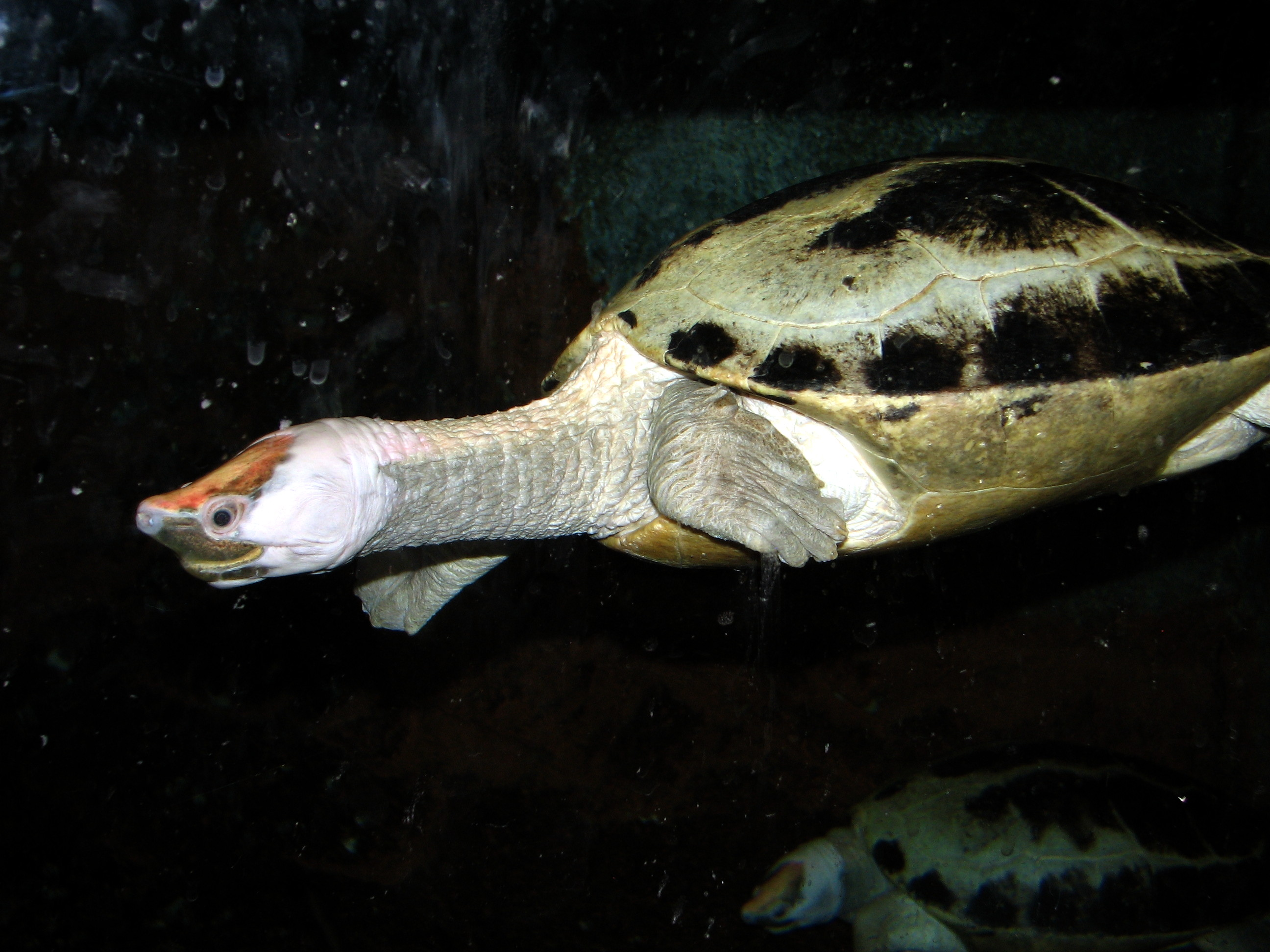
At Newport Aquarium, Newport, Kentucky

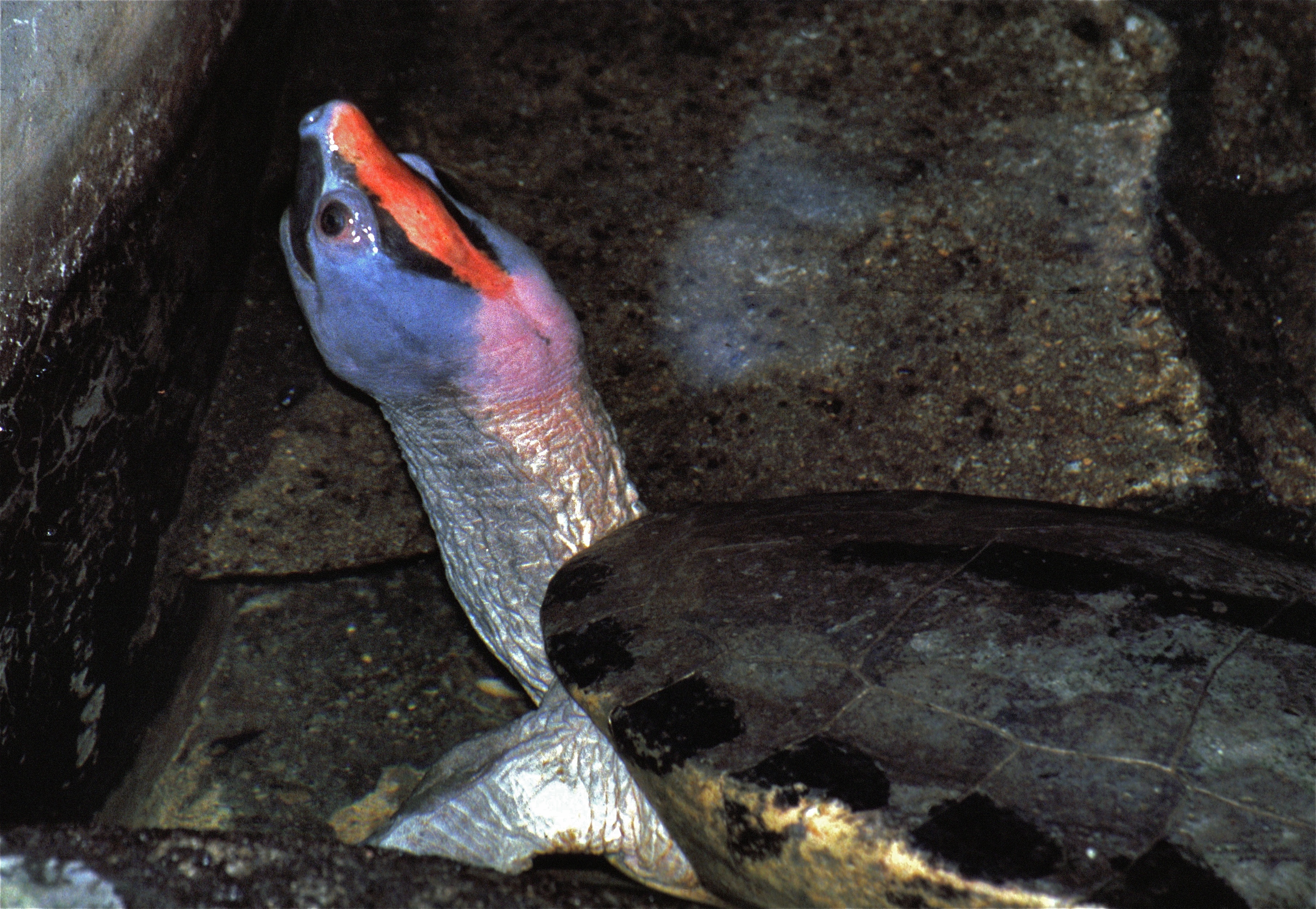
In captivity, Thailand

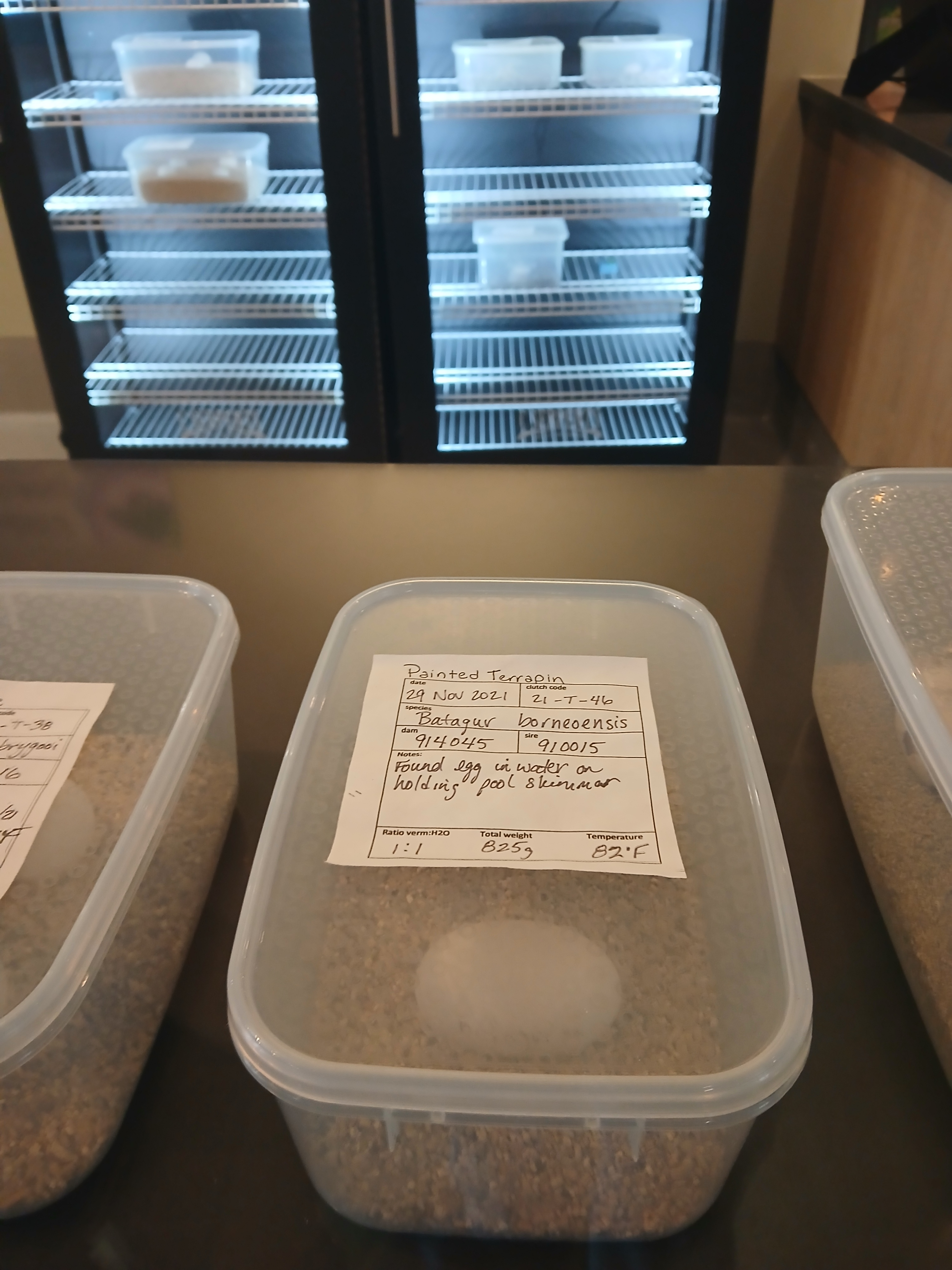
Painted Terrapin eggs at the San Diego Zoo

== Status ==
The painted terrapin is critically endangered species according to IUCN, listed in The World's Most 25 Endangered Freshwater Turtles and Tortoises 2011. It is listed in Appendix II, with a zero quota for commercial trade of wild-captured specimens according to the CITES meeting in Thailand, March 2013.

Batagur borneoensis is a priority species to be conserved in Indonesia according to Minister of Forestry Decree No. 57 Year 2008 about Strategic Direction of National Species Conservation 2008–18. In Malaysia, this species is protected by the World Wide Fund for Nature.

== Threats ==
Harvesting by fishermen to eat, poaching to meet pet and food demand, habitat loss due to land conversion to palm oil, and fish and shrimp farming are major threats.

== Conservation ==
Conservation efforts in Sumatra, Indonesia, are ongoing to increase wild populations by carrying out nesting patrols to secure and hatch the eggs, for later release into original habitats.

In Malaysia, the painted terrapin is protected through the WWF's hawksbill turtle and painted terrapin conservation project. The project aims establish the protection and effective management of critical nesting habitats of painted terrapins and their key habitats, through measures that are scientifically based and socially acceptable, and that can be sustained in the long term by government, the local community and other stakeholders.
