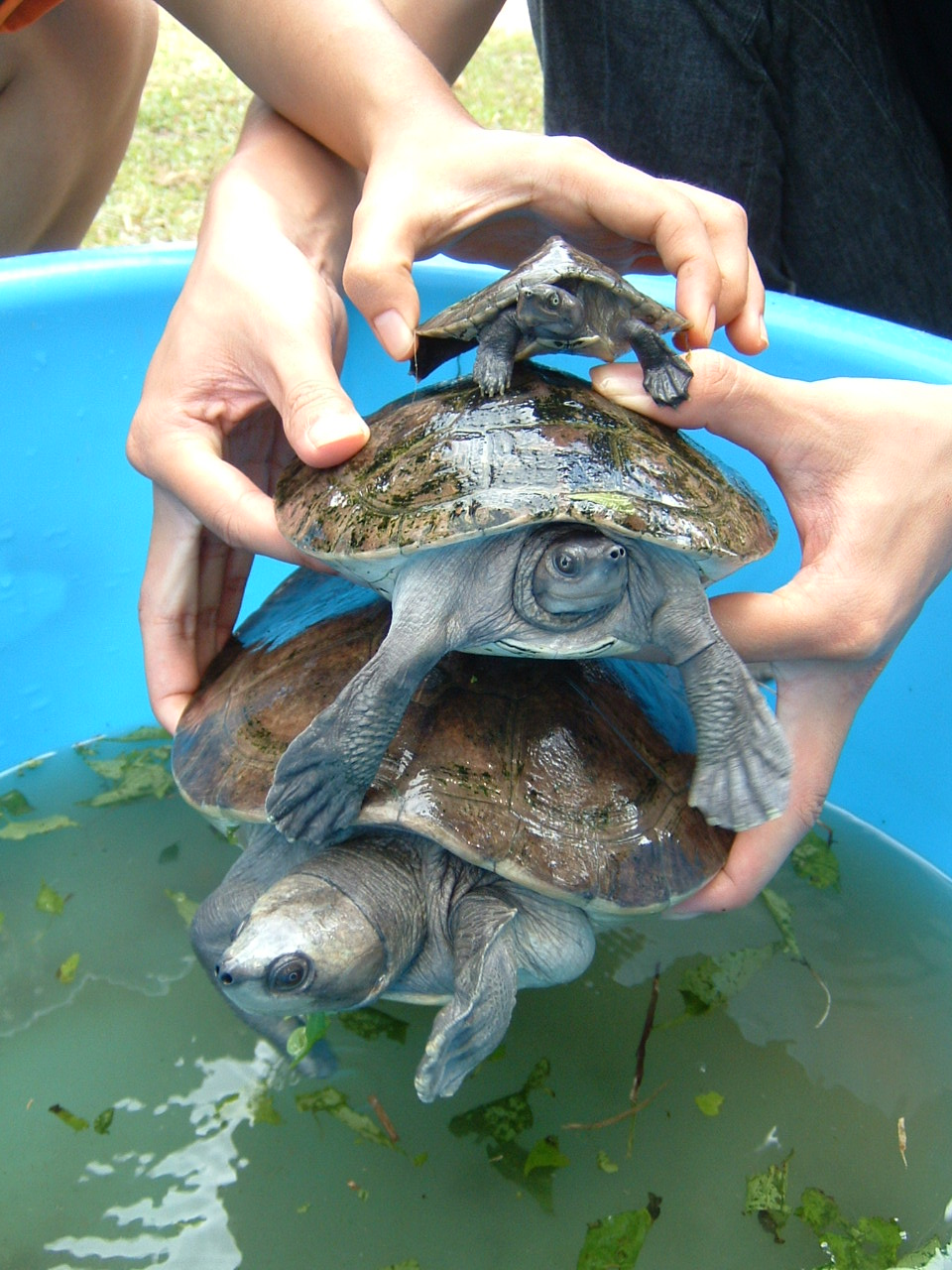
- (Batagur affinis) from a gazetted conservation site at Kuala Berang, Terengganu, Malaysia.

Scientific classification
- Kingdom: Animalia
- Phylum: Chordata
- Class: Reptilia
- Order: Testudines
- Suborder: Cryptodira
- Family: Geoemydidae
- Subfamily: Geoemydinae
- Genus: Batagur; Gray, 1856

Synonyms
- Tetraonyx - Gray, 1830; Tetronyx - Lesson, 1832; Kachuga - Gray, 1856; Batagurella - Gray 1869; Dongoka - Gray, 1869; Callagur - Gray, 1870; Cantorella - Gray, 1870

= Batagur =

Genus of turtles

Batagur is a genus of large turtles from South and Southeast Asia. All members of the genus are seriously threatened. With a 2007 merger with members from two other genera, this genus has six described species.

== Species ==
- Batagur affinis – southern river terrapin
- Batagur baska – northern river terrapin
- Batagur borneoensis – painted terrapin (formerly in Callagur)
- Batagur dhongoka – three-striped roofed turtle (formerly in Kachuga)
- Batagur kachuga – red-crowned roofed turtle (formerly in Kachuga)
- Batagur trivittata – Burmese roofed turtle (formerly in Kachuga)
