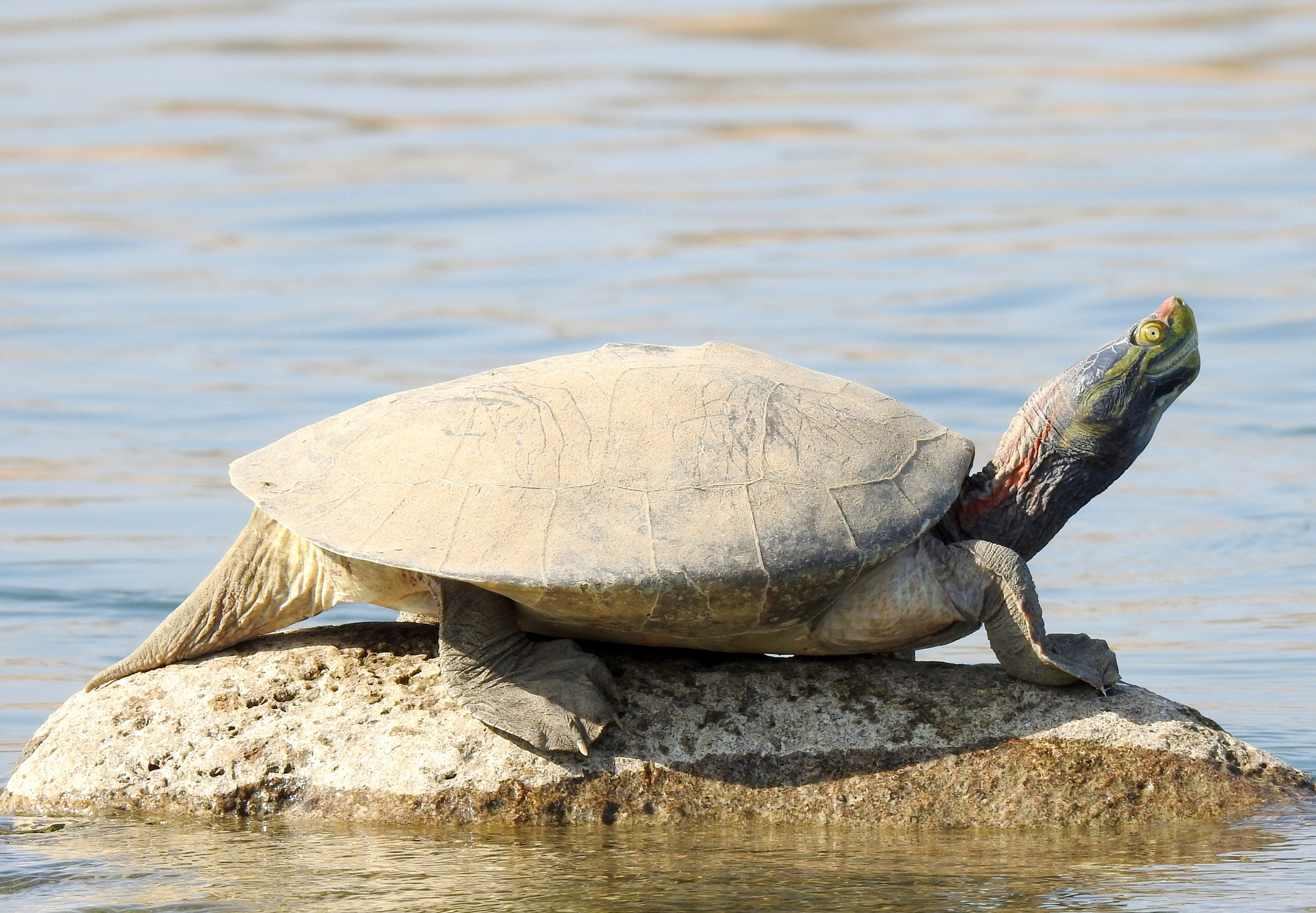
- Adult male in National Chambal Sanctuary, India
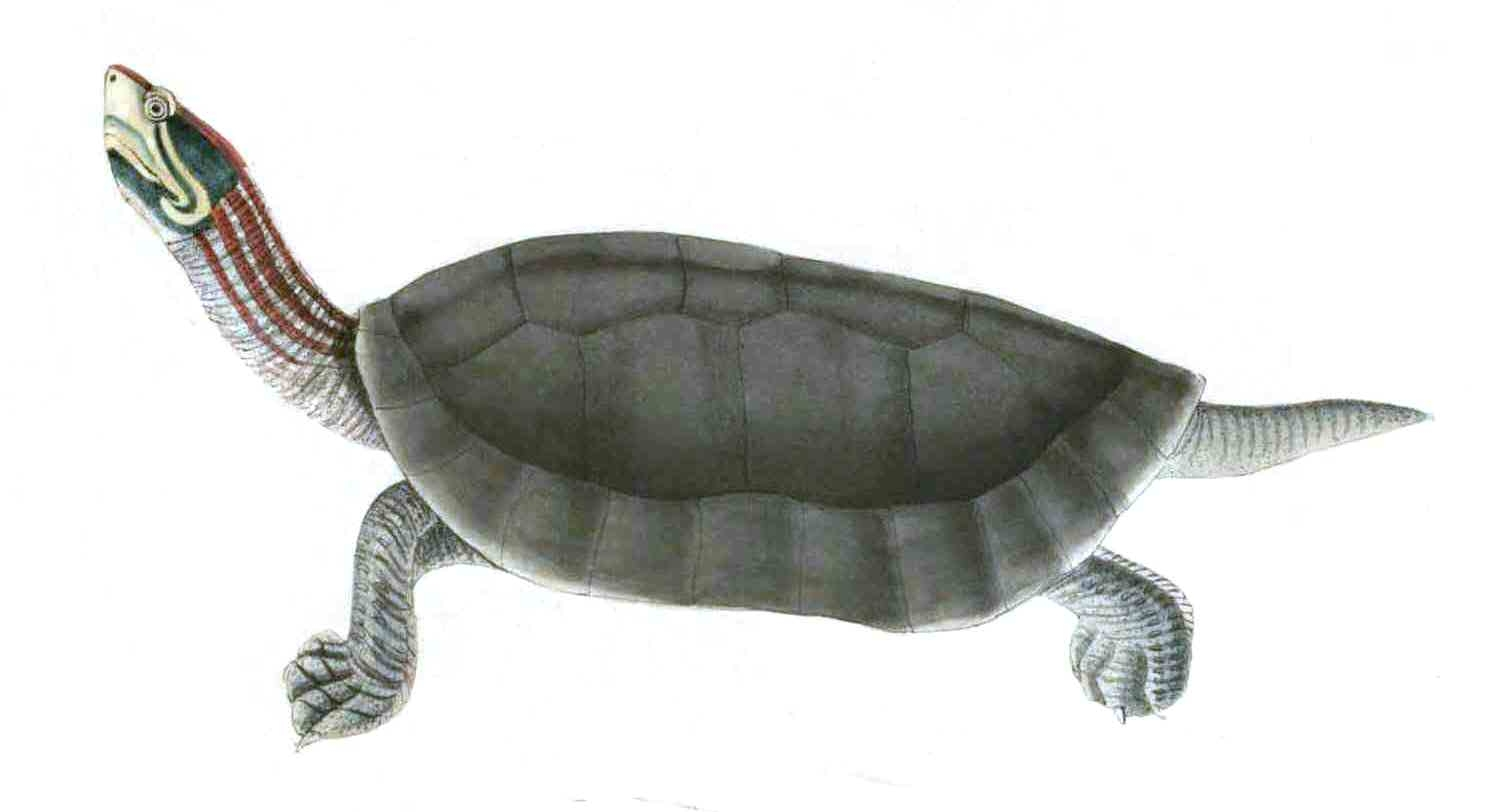
- Illustration, based on Francis Buchanan-Hamilton's drawing (1832)

Conservation status
- Critically Endangered (IUCN 3.1)
- CITES Appendix I

Scientific classification
- Kingdom: Animalia
- Phylum: Chordata
- Class: Reptilia
- Order: Testudines
- Suborder: Cryptodira
- Family: Geoemydidae
- Genus: Batagur
- Species: B. kachuga

Binomial name
- Batagur kachuga (Gray, 1831)

Synonyms
- List: Emys kachuga Gray, 1831; Emys lineata Gray, 1831; Clemmys (Clemmys) lineata — Fitzinger, 1835; Batagur (Kachuga) lineata — Gray, 1856; Batagur ellioti Gray, 1862; Batagur lineatus — Günther, 1864; Clemmys ellioti — Strauch, 1865; Kachuga fusca Gray, 1870; Kachuga lineata — Gray, 1870; Batagur kachuga — Theobald, 1876; Batagur bakeri Lydekker, 1885; Kachuga kachuga — M.A. Smith, 1931; Batagur kachuga — Le et al., 2007

= Red-crowned roofed turtle =

Species of turtle

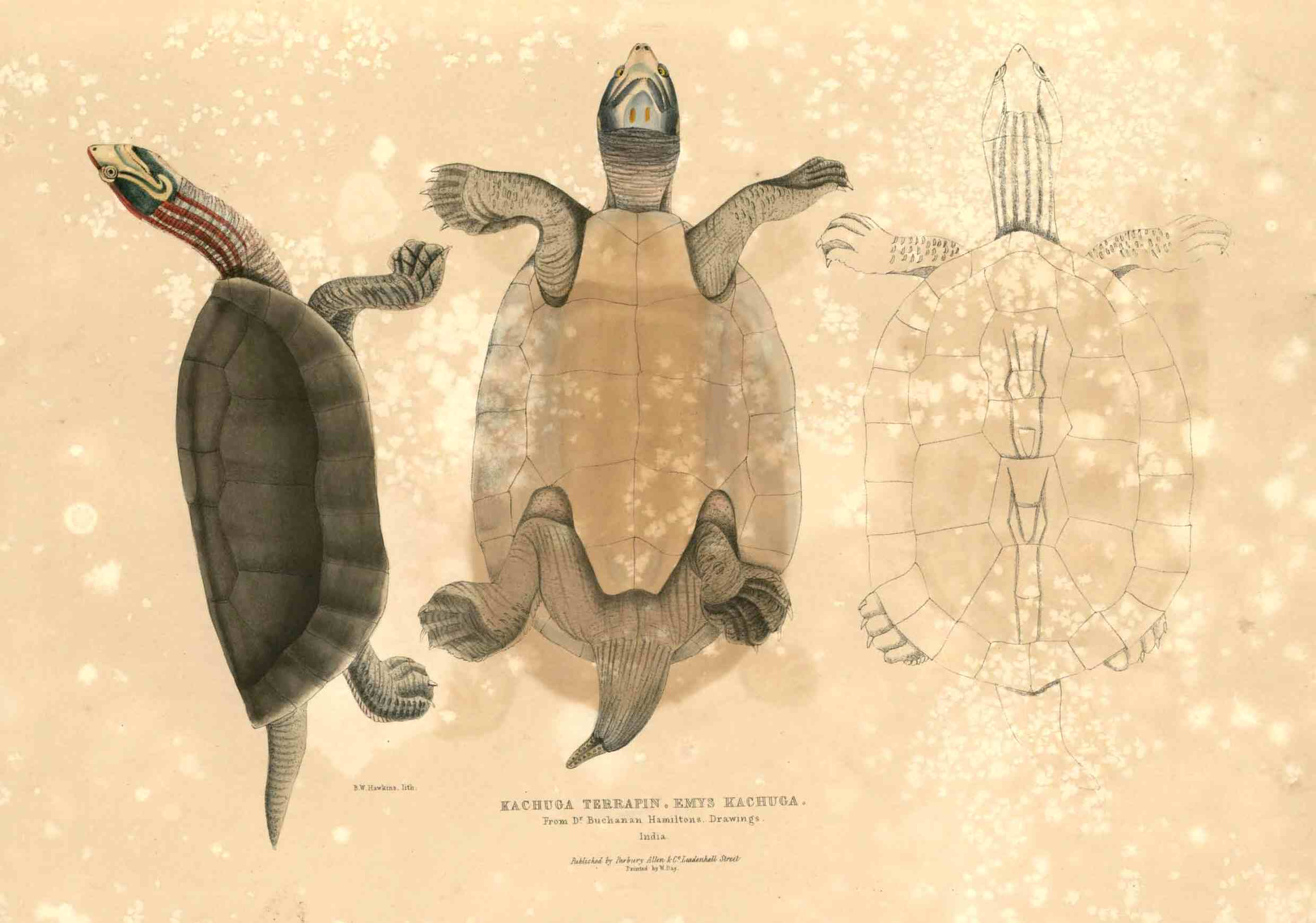
B. kachuga illustration

The red-crowned roofed turtle or Bengal roof turtle (Batagur kachuga) is a species of freshwater turtle endemic to South Asia. It was the type species of its former genus Kachuga. Females can grow to a shell length of 56 cm (22 in) and weigh 25 kilograms (55 lb), but males are considerably smaller. The turtles like to bask in the sun on land. In the breeding season, the heads and necks of male turtles exhibit bright red, yellow and blue coloration. The females excavate nests in which they lay clutches of up to thirty eggs.

Historically, this turtle was found in central Nepal, northeastern India, Bangladesh and probably Burma (Myanmar), but it has suffered declines in population due to being harvested for meat and shells, drowned in fishing nets, water pollution, hydro-electric schemes and habitat loss. Fewer than four hundred adult females are thought to remain in the wild, with the International Union for Conservation of Nature rating this turtle as being "critically endangered". India has put conservation measures in place, and a captive breeding programme has been initiated.

== Description ==
It can weigh up to 25 kilograms (55 lb) and have shells as long as 56 centimeters (22 in). Males reach only half the length of females. At the end of the rainy season, the heads and necks of male turtles develop a brilliant courtship coloration of red, yellow, white, and blue, with 6 distinctive bright red stripes on top of the head.

The carapace of the young is strongly keeled. The keels are tubercular posteriorly on the second and third vertebral shields. The posterior margin is strongly crenulated. The marginal serrature disappears in adolescent specimens and the vertebral keel, after being reduced to a series of low knobs, vanishes entirely in the full-grown, the carapace of which is very convex. The nuchal shield is small, trapezoidal and broadest posteriorly. The first vertebral is as broad or broader in front as behind. The second vertebral is longer than the third, with which it forms a straight transverse suture. The fourth is longest and forms a broad suture with the third. The second vertebral is broader than long in the young, and as long as broad in the adult. Plastron is angulate laterally in the young. The anterior and posterior lobes are rather narrow and shorter than the width of the bridge, truncate anteriorly and are openly notched posteriorly. The longest median suture is between the abdominals and the shortest is between the gulars, which equals about one half that between the humerals. The suture between gulars and humerals forms an obtuse angle, as does that between humerals and pectorals. The inguinal is large and the axillary is smaller.

The head is moderate size with an obtuse and moderately prominent snout. The jaws have denticulated edges with the upper not notched mesially. Alveolar surfaces are very broad, the median ridge of the upper jaw being somewhat nearer the outer than the inner margin. Choanae are behind the line of the posterior borders of the orbits. The width of the lower jaw at the symphysis equals the diameter of the orbit. The limbs have transversely enlarged, band-like scales which are colored brown above and yellowish below. The nape has red longitudinal lines.

== Geographic range ==
This reptile was historically widespread in Central Nepal, NE India, Bangladesh, primarily in deep flowing freshwater rivers with terrestrial nest sites in the watershed of the Ganges River and probably NW Burma. Type locality: "India"; restricted by M.A. Smith 1931:131, to "N. India."

The National Chambal Sanctuary portion of the Chambal River has received moderate protection since 1979 as India's only protected riverine habitat. It is believed to be one of the last viable habitats for this species, though even here, B. kachuga are rare. Recent annual nesting surveys indicate fewer than 400 adult females remaining in the wild.

== Diet ==
The diet of red-crowned roofed turtles consists entirely of aquatic plants.

== Behavior ==
They leave the water to thermoregulate by basking in the sun on rocks, logs, and sandbanks.

== Reproduction ==
Adult females lay eggs in March and April. The eggs are 64–75 mm (2 1/2–3 in) long by 38–46 mm (1 1/2–1 3/4 in) wide. Clutch size varies from 11 to 30 eggs.

== Threats ==
The large Batagur turtles are probably the most threatened freshwater turtles in India. Their populations have now been drastically reduced due to poaching for their meat and shells, accidental drowning in fishing gear, water pollution, hydroelectric infrastructure projects, habitat destruction by sand mining, and egg predation by jackals.

== Conservation ==
Since 2004, B. kachuga has reproduced in captivity at the Madras Crocodile Bank Trust. A total of 132 eggs were laid through 2009 with an overall viability of 69%. 75 hatchlings were produced from these eggs, with 24 young turtles sent to Uttar Pradesh for release in 2007.

Since 2006, the Chambal River Sanctuary Program of Turtle Survival Alliance- India has implemented projects to protect wild nests, collect and hatch wild eggs in hatchery conditions, raise hatchlings to 1 kilogram (2.2 lb) at about 4 years age, conduct survival and migration studies of tagged and released hatchlings and conduct surveys over 400 kilometers (250 mi) of river to determine nesting locations, nesting density, nest depredation rates, and anthropogenic pressures on the turtles.
