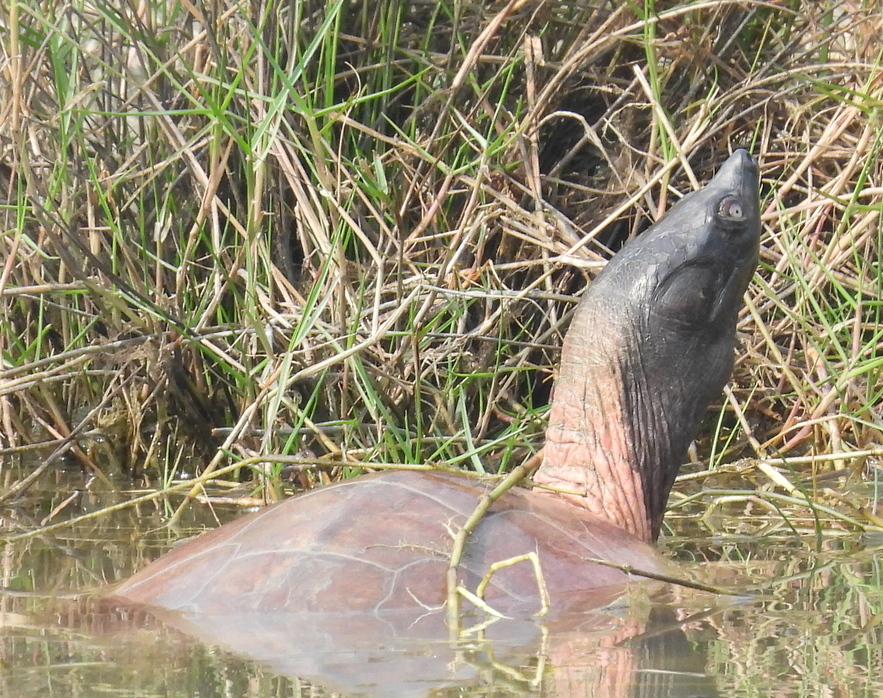
- Male in breeding colours

Conservation status
- Critically Endangered (IUCN 3.1)
- CITES Appendix I (CITES)

Scientific classification
- Kingdom: Animalia
- Phylum: Chordata
- Class: Reptilia
- Order: Testudines
- Suborder: Cryptodira
- Family: Geoemydidae
- Genus: Batagur
- Species: B. baska

Binomial name
- Batagur baska (Gray, 1830)

Synonyms
- click to expand: Emys baska Gray, 1830; Emys batagur Gray, 1831; Testudo baska Gray, 1831; Trionyx (Tetraonyx) cuvieri Gray, 1831; Tetronyx longicollis Lesson, 1834; Tetronyx baska Duméril & Bibron, 1835; Tetraonyx lessonii Duméril & Bibron, 1835; Tetraonyx longicollis Duméril & Bibron, 1835; Clemmys (Clemmys) batagur Fitzinger, 1835; Hydraspis (Tetronyx) lessonii Fitzinger, 1835; Emys tetraonyx Temminck & Schlegel, 1835; Tetraonyx batagur Gray, 1844; Batagur (Batagur) baska Gray, 1856; Clemmys longicollis Strauch, 1862; Tetraonyx baska Gray, 1869; Batagur batagur Lindholm, 1929; Tetraonyx lessoni Bourret, 1941 (ex errore); Batagur ranongensis Nutaphand, 1979; Batagur basca Anan'eva, 1988 (ex errore); Batagur batagur batagur Joseph-Ouni, 2004; Batagur batagur ranongensis Joseph-Ouni, 2004

= Northern river terrapin =

Species of turtle

The northern river terrapin (Batagur baska) is a species of riverine turtle native to Southeast Asia. It has been classified as Critically Endangered on the IUCN Red List and considered extinct in much of its former range; as of 2018, the population in the wild was estimated at 100 mature individuals.

== Description ==
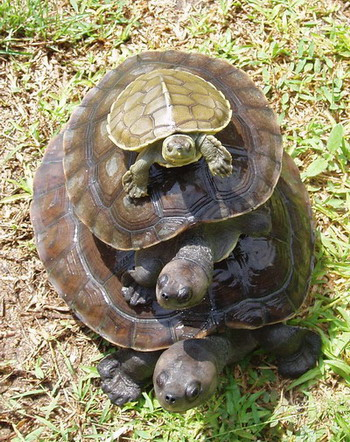
(From top to bottom) hatchling of about a week old, one year old and two years old

The northern river terrapin is one of Asia's largest freshwater and brackwater turtles, reaching a carapace length of up to 60 cm and a maximum weight of 18 kg. Its carapace is moderately depressed, with a vertebral keel in juveniles. The plastron is large, strongly angulate laterally in the young, convex in the adult. The head is rather small, with a pointed and upwards-tending snout. The legs have band-like scales.

The upper surface of the carapace and the soft parts are generally olive-brown, while the plastron is yellowish. Head and neck are brown with reddish bases. Males in breeding coloration have a black head and neck with a crimson or orange dorsal surface and red or orange forelegs. The colour of the pupils also changes during this period, to brown in females and yellow-white in males. During the breeding season, the color of the pupils of a female brown whereas the pupils in the males become yellowish-white.

== Distribution and habitat ==
The northern river terrapin is distributed in the Sunderbans of India and Bangladesh. It is regionally extinct in Myanmar and Thailand. It is strongly aquatic but uses terrestrial nesting sites, frequenting the tidal areas of estuaries, large rivers, and mangrove forests.

== Ecology ==
The northern river terrapin is omnivorous, taking waterside plants and small animals such as clams. The species prefers freshwater habitats and moves to brackish river mouths or estuaries in the breeding season (December–March), returning after laying their eggs. Individuals have been known to undertake long seasonal migrations of 50 to 60 miles to the sand banks where they were hatched. Females usually lay three clutches of 10–34 eggs each.

== Conservation ==
The species is considered Critically Endangered by the IUCN, principally due to exploitation as a food item (including egg harvesting). Previously, immense numbers were shipped into the fish markets of Calcutta from throughout India; among the Bengali Hindus, the river terrapin was considered the most delectable of all turtles. It is still illegally exported from Indonesia and traded in large numbers in China. Loss of nesting beaches and pollution are also impacting the species.

A hatchery and captive breeding project was established in Bhawal National Park in Bangladesh and another in Sajnakhali Wildlife Sanctuary in the Sunderban Tiger Reserve in India with support from Turtle Survival Alliance and Dr. Peter Praschag, the founder of Turtle Island.

After conducting conservation genetics studies on this critically endangered species, Dr. Peter Praschag in collaboration with the Schönbrunn Zoo in Austria, established the only breeding group of this species outside of its native countries. In May 2010, two northern river terrapins successfully hatched at Turtle Island, making this the first-ever captive breeding of Batagur baska worldwide.

In 2015, Dr. Peter Praschag and the Schönbrunn Zoo expanded their conservation efforts by establishing an additional breeding center for the northern river terrapin in Karamjal, at the edge of the Sundarbans in Bangladesh. This center along with the station at Bhawal National Park has successfully bred and raised juveniles of this species. Prior to the establishment of these centers, in 2005, the global population of B. baska was critically low, with only two known living females at the Madras Crocodile Bank Trust in Tamil Nadu, India. As of 2024, the combined efforts of these centers, have resulted in a thriving population of 565 individuals in these centers and an estimated worldwide population of 800.

== Taxonomy ==
Two subspecies are recognized: B. b. baska (Gray, 1831) and B. b. ranongensis (Nutaphand, 1979).

== See also ==
- Southern river terrapin
