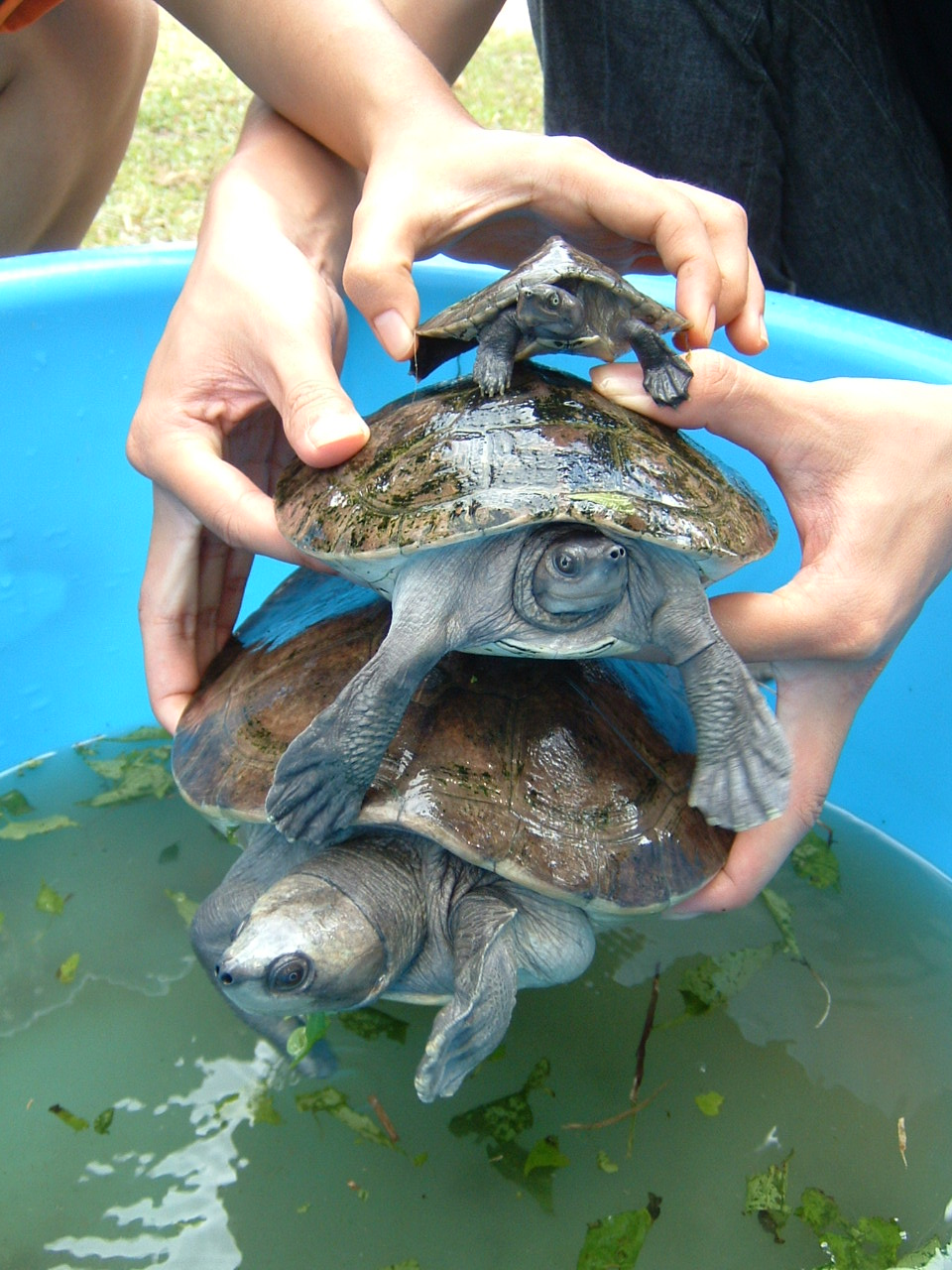
- (Batagur affinis) from a gazetted conservation site at Kuala Berang, Terengganu, Malaysia

Conservation status
- Critically Endangered (IUCN 3.1)
- CITES Appendix I

Scientific classification
- Kingdom: Animalia
- Phylum: Chordata
- Class: Reptilia
- Order: Testudines
- Suborder: Cryptodira
- Family: Geoemydidae
- Genus: Batagur
- Species: B. affinis

Binomial name
- Batagur affinis (Cantor, 1847)

= Southern river terrapin =

Species of turtle

The southern river terrapin (Batagur affinis) is a riverine turtle of the family Geoemydidae found in Malaysia, Indonesia and Cambodia.

== Etymology ==
The Southern River Terrapin derives its common name from its native range of Peninsular Malaysia, located in the southern half of Malaysia.

Locals in Malaysia colloquially refer to the species as "tuntung" due to repetitive sounds made from the terrapin's plastron packing sand during nest construction.

== Distribution ==
Batagur affinis occupies the western coast of Malaysia, western coast of Indonesia, and the southern region of Thailand on the western Malaysian Peninsula.

=== Fossil record ===
Archeological evidence of the Southern river terrapin has been discovered in the Bang Pakaong River of southeast Thailand, suggesting that B. affinis has historically inhabited major rivers that converge into southern part of the China Sea.

== Taxonomy ==
Batagur affinis belongs to the family Geoemydidae with its relatives B. baska and B. kachuga of South Asia. After studying the DNA sequences of mitochondrial cytochrome b gene, both Batagur affinis and Batagur baska were shown to be two separate species.

The more northern species were named B. baska. The specific epithet affinis was proposed by Cantor (1847) to categorize river terrapin hatchlings and painted terrapin hatchlings (Batagur borneoensis) from Penang Island and was also used for southern terrapin species occupying Thailand, Malaysia, and Indonesia.

As coloration, morphology and behavior of terrapin populations became more distinct among west and east coasts of Malaysia, and significantly different from river terrapin populations in Cambodia, therefore taxonomic assessments were performed to confirm their relatedness. Phylogenetic anaylses of three mitochondrial and three nuclear DNA fragments were compared to among Batagur species. The Cambodian Batagur was found to be closely related to but separate from B. affinnis from Sumatra and the west coast of the Malay Peninsula. Morphologically they are identical but in terms of genetics they are different.

The new subspecies Batagur affinis edwardmolli once inhabited estuaries surrounding the gulf of Thailand.

=== Subspecies ===
- Batagur affinis affinis
- Batagur affinis edwardmolli

== Characteristics ==
A large river turtle with an average carapace length of 625 mm, and an average body weight of 38kg with a big shell proportionate to its large size. The high-arched shell is rife with buttresses which provide structural support and protect its vital organs. The shell is responsible for a quarter of the terrapin's body weight, consisting of a carapace with wide vertebral scutes and an anteriorly truncate plastron that is relatively shorter in length (than the carapace).

This highly aquatic turtle has an increased shell strength due to complete ankylosis at maturity. Bones of the carapace are fused together as one to prevent the shell from splitting further if it is crushed.

Female Southern river terrapins are known for typically being larger than males and have an earlier sexual maturity. In addition to difference in body size, adult males can be identified by their more extensive tail which is longer length and is thicker.

The shells of hatchlings have serrated edges of the marginal scutes, spines running down the middle of the carapace, and a vertebral keel . As the hatchlings mature, the vertebral keel, spines, and serrations disappear with age. Hatchlings from the west coast of Malaysia average somewhat smaller than those from the east coast.

Morphological traits displayed in the southern river terrapin vary by geographic location. Juveniles and females from the western coast of Malaysia are display gray to greenish or bluish-gray coloring dorsally, and becomes increasingly lighter in color ventrally. Their eyes are brown and their jaw is yellow muted by a mix of gray coloring. The carapace is brown to olive-brown or gray and the plastron is a dull yellow. Females and juveniles on the east coast of Malaysia display similar coloring except they possess a silver patch on the side of the head behind the eyes.

Southern River Terrapin males exhibit different appearances sexually and seasonally. On the west coast, non-breeding males appear a darker olive-brown on their scales and shell compared to females and possess a yellow iris. During breeding season males have bright white irises with a dark cornea and a black body including the head, neck, limbs and carapace. Before males sexually mature they tend to have lighter eyes than females.

It has large strong limbs with broad webbed feet, with four claws on its forefeet and five on the back-feet. This terrapin species has two longitudinal denticulated ridges on the upper jaw with two toothlike projections in the mouth. At the back of the head, numerous irregularly shaped scales cover the surface.The southern river terrapin's most distinctive physical feature is its upturned nostrils.

== Ecology and behavior ==
=== Habitat ===
Southern River Terrapins be found primarily in brackish estuaries, mangrove creeks, coastal lagoons, inland freshwater rivers, and tidal regions of large rivers. Movements of the turtles in the river occur simultaneously with the direction of the water current. When the tides rise, they enter small river tributaries and forage on bank vegetation. As tides fall they return down river. Despite living in estuaries, terrapins possess a physiological intolerance to salinity above 20 ppt. To avoid the risks of consuming high concentrations of saline water, they do not forage on floating vegetation.

=== Diet ===
Wild terrapins are omnivorous. Their diet consists of vegetation, fruits, and mollusks. Their serrated beaks allow them to consume various types of plants including mangrove apple, sedges, screw palm apple, colocasia, and water hyacinth. In addition, they also ingest certain types of vine plants, grasses and fruits such as wild mangosteen and Malay apple.

=== Reproduction ===
Courtship upon river terrapin mates involve both noses touching one another until the male raises his head, opens his mouth and pulses his throat and lower jaw to expose white throat stripes that adds heavy contrast to the dark black head and body.

Nesting occurs during the dry season which ranges from November to March when the sand banks face lower river levels. Dry season conditions allow for females to move up sandbanks to lay their eggs. There is a significant disparity in nesting behaviors between eastern and western Malaysia. Populations on the west coast of Malaysia create nests at the bottom of deep sand pits and then they make another pit to confuse predators who consume their eggs. Conversely, females on the east coast of Malaysia create multiple nests and divides a single clutch into all the nests. Several clutches may be laid in a season.

The sex of the offspring is determined by the temperature of the environment. Southern River Terrapins are temperature-dependent sex determination (TSD). A nesting season has not yet produced a similarly equal sex ratios. In natural conditions number eggs in sand nests can produce up to 100% of female hatchlings.

== Conservation ==
=== Cause of decline ===
Many Asian turtles are in danger because of the thriving trade in animals in the region, where a species' rarity can add to its value on a menu or as a traditional medicine. The river terrapin's decline is a result of the exploitation of their eggs and flesh. Viable populations in the wild are threatened by habitat alteration and destruction. Specifically, they face deforestation, tin and sand mining, dam building, and erosion control methods which negative impact nesting areas and food resources.

In addition, the plant diversity in Malaysia is affecting Southern River Terrapin populations. Silt deposits from floods has caused an overproduction of Lalang grass (Imperata cylindrica). This plant invades nesting beaches of river terrapins at a rapid rate and has left populations with less land to lay their eggs. Now terrapins depend on Wildlife officials and egg collectors to clear the invasive plants.

Over-harvesting of eggs due to their cultural value. In some areas they are believed to be used as an aphrodisiac. In 1930s, 500,000 eggs were harvested in one year. When the Japanese occupied Malaysia during World War II a large quantity of eggs and individual terrapins were eaten to sustain humans.

=== Efforts to re-establish populations ===
The species was thought to have disappeared from Cambodia until it was rediscovered in 2001. Conservationists eventually began tagging the animals with tracking devices and monitoring their nests, and King Norodom Sihamoni personally ordered their protection. Its eggs were a delicacy of the royal cuisine of Cambodia. In 2005, it was designated the national reptile of Cambodia in an effort to bring awareness and conservation for this species. In July 2015, conservationists in Cambodia cautiously stated that efforts to bring back the species from the brink of extinction were having some success. A number of turtles, including breeding pairs, have been moved from enclosed areas into their intended home, the rivers and shores of Koh Kong where, it is hoped – with the ongoing monitoring and protection of locals and conservationists – they will begin to flourish. They began their conservation effort by ensuring the safety of the hatchlings through fencing the nesting area of the species, given that the extremely low number of nests laid already.

The Malaysian government has established hatcheries and licensed egg collectors, who take from certain permitted areas so that terrapin populations can have high turn over rate to ensure the survival of the species. Although rules have been established, they are not being strictly enforced. As a result poaching is increasing.

In Malaysia, rivers of Kedah, Perak and Terengganu are major nesting grounds though the population continues to crash despite conservation efforts undertaken by Malaysian Wildlife Department for over 20 years. Pasir Temir and Pasir Lubuk Kawah by the Terengganu River are the largest nesting sites for Batagur baska in the world. There has been a major increase in the abundance of the Southern River terrapin in Terengganu River. The first hatchery was established in 1967 on the Perak River and conservation action has expanded into captive breeding. Today, facilities located in Cambodia, Malaysia, and Thailand possess adults for the purpose of eventual release when reintroduction may be necessary to maintain wild populations as they continue to disappear.

== See also ==
- Northern river terrapin
