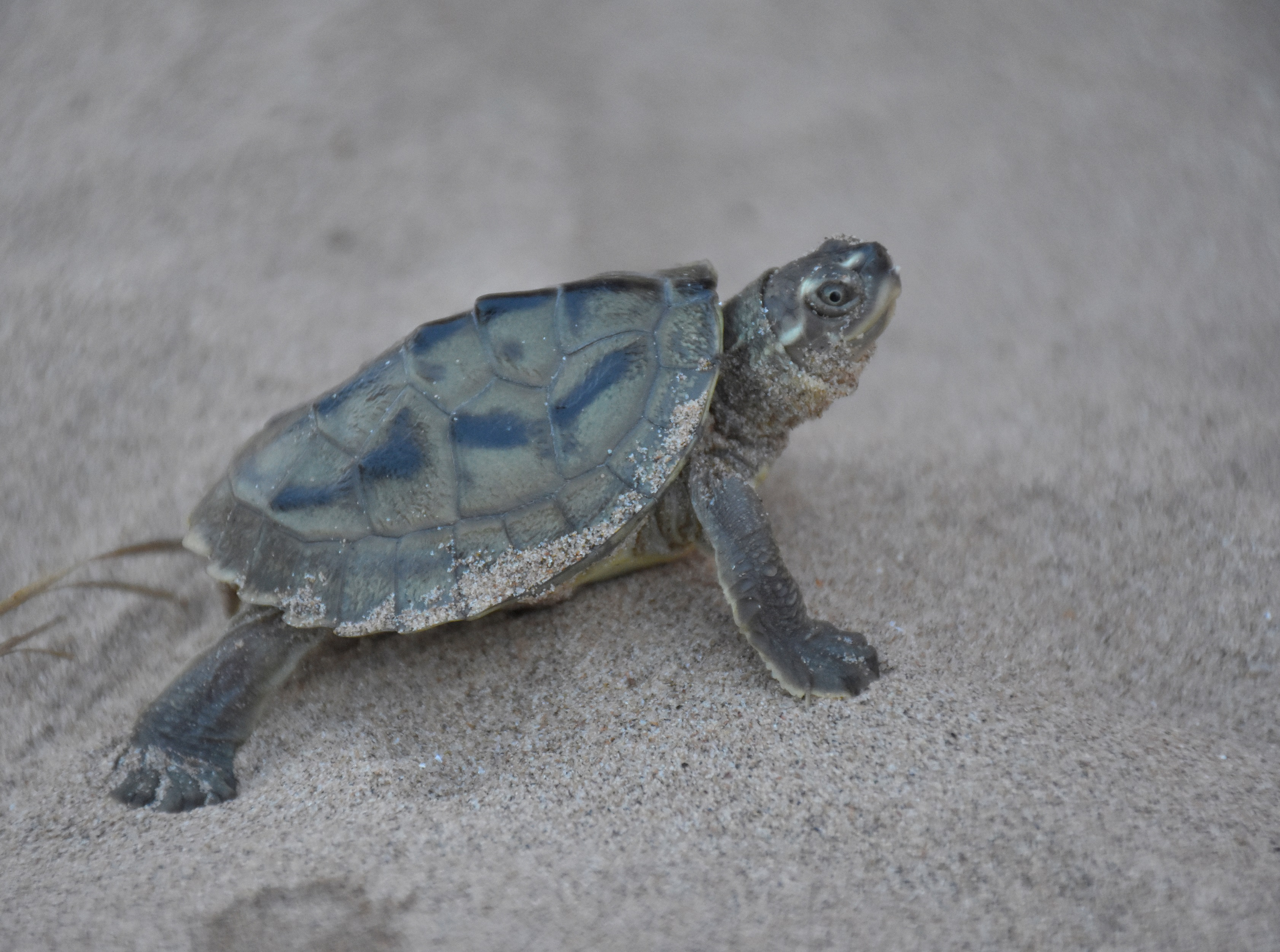
- Live hatchling Batagur dhongoka
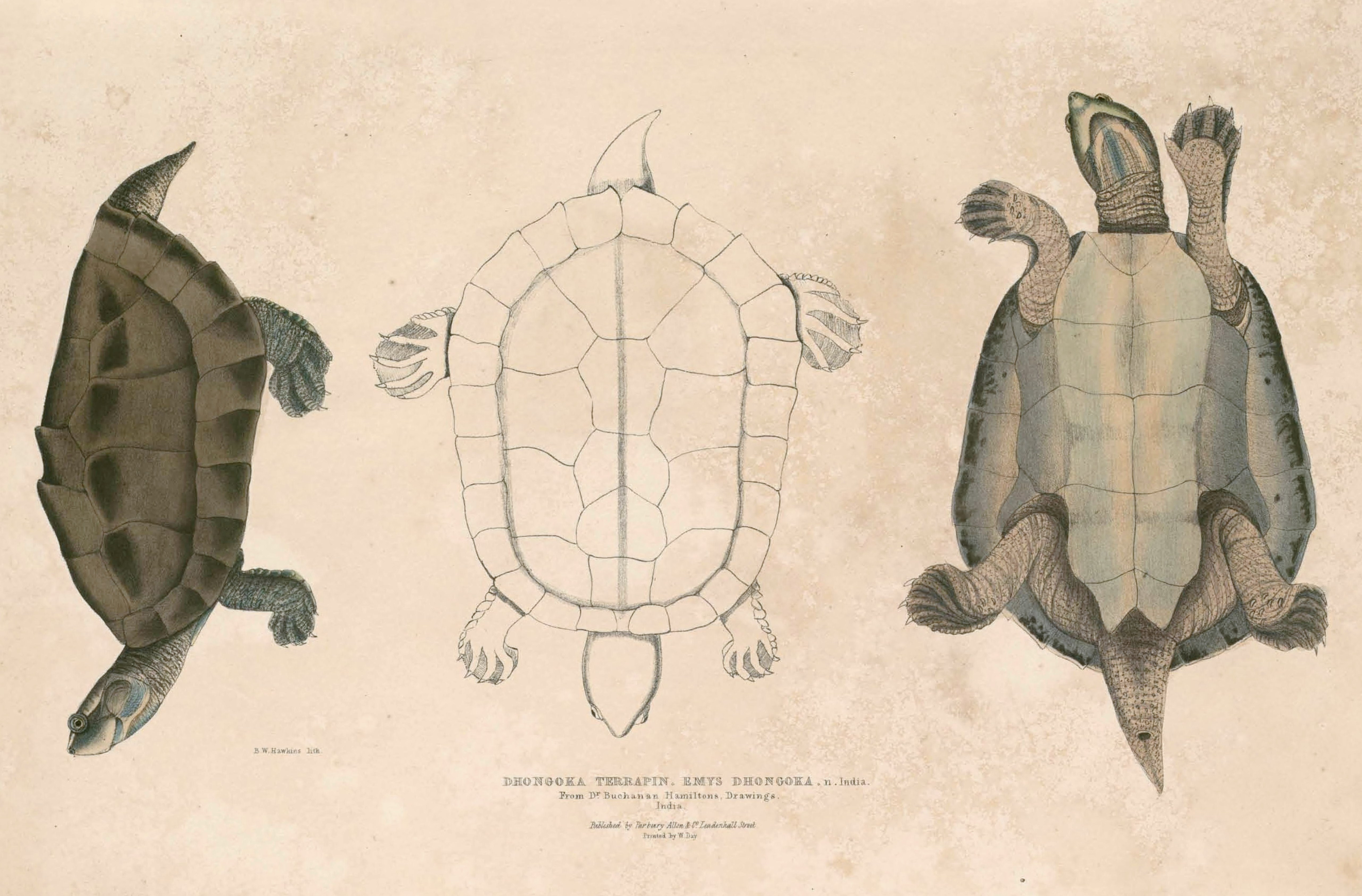
- Illustration

Conservation status
- Critically Endangered (IUCN 3.1)
- CITES Appendix II

Scientific classification
- Kingdom: Animalia
- Phylum: Chordata
- Class: Reptilia
- Order: Testudines
- Suborder: Cryptodira
- Family: Geoemydidae
- Genus: Batagur
- Species: B. dhongoka

Binomial name
- Batagur dhongoka (Gray, 1832)

Synonyms
- Emys dhongoka Gray, 1832; Emys duvaucelii A.M.C. Duméril & Bibron, 1835; Emys duvaucellii [sic] Gray, 1844 (ex errore); Batagur (Kachuga) dhongoka — Gray, 1856; Clemmys dhongoka — Strauch, 1862; Kachuga hardwickii Gray, 1869; Dhongoka hardwickii — Gray, 1870; Batagur dhougoka [sic] Gray, 1873 (ex errore); Dhougoka hardwickii — Gray, 1873; Emys duvancellii [sic] Gray, 1873 (ex errore); Batagur durandi Lydekker, 1885; Kachuga dhongoka — Boulenger, 1889; Batagur duvaucelii — Anderson, 1879; Emys duvauceli [sic] M.A. Smith, 1931 (ex errore); Kachuga dhongoca [sic] Tikader & Sharma, 1985 (ex errore); Kachuga drongoka [sic] Moll, 1986 (ex errore)

= Three-striped roofed turtle =

Species of turtle

The three-striped roofed turtle (Batagur dhongoka) is a species of turtle in the family Geoemydidae. The species is endemic to South Asia.

== Geographic range ==
The three-striped roofed turtle is found in Bangladesh, India (Assam, Bihar, Madhya Pradesh, Rajasthan, Uttar Pradesh, West Bengal), and possibly in Nepal.
