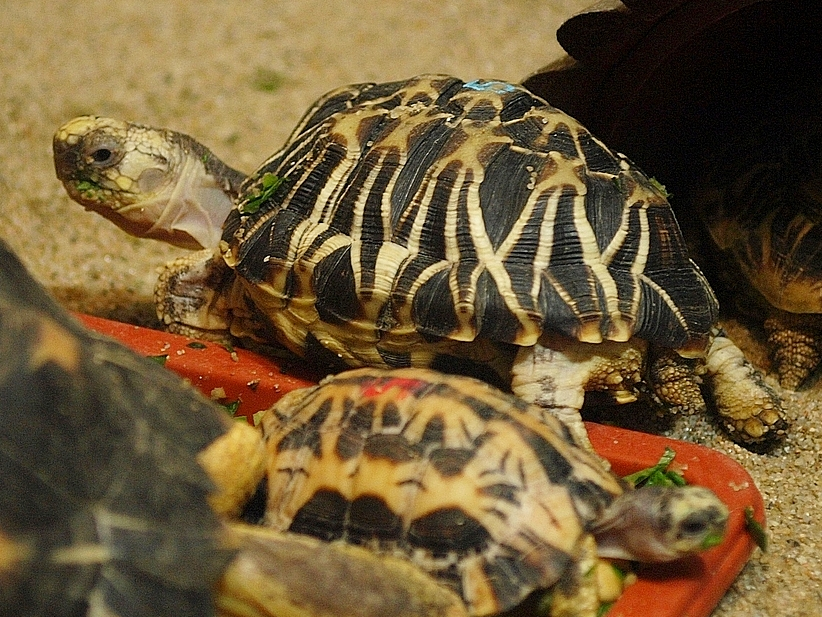
- At Sunshine International Aquarium, Japan

Conservation status
- Critically Endangered (IUCN 3.1)
- CITES Appendix I

Scientific classification
- Kingdom: Animalia
- Phylum: Chordata
- Class: Reptilia
- Order: Testudines
- Suborder: Cryptodira
- Family: Testudinidae
- Genus: Geochelone
- Species: G. platynota

Binomial name
- Geochelone platynota (Blyth, 1863)

Synonyms
- Testudo platynota Blyth, 1863; Peltastes platynotus Gray, 1870; Testudo platinota Bourret, 1941 (ex errore); Testudo platynotus Bourret, 1941; Geochelone platynota Loveridge & Williams, 1957; Geochelone elegans platynota Obst, 1985; Geochelone platynotata Paull, 1997 (ex errore)

= Burmese star tortoise =

Species of tortoise

The Burmese star tortoise (Geochelone platynota) is a critically endangered tortoise species, native to the dry, deciduous forests of Myanmar (Burma).

== Taxonomy ==
The species was first described in 1863 by Edward Blyth, who placed it in the genus Testudo. The type locality of the species is the Irrawaddy Valley of Myanmar. The specific name platynota is derived from the Greek platys 'flat, even, broad, wide' and notos 'the back', in reference to the species having a carapace that is slightly more flattened than that of Geochelone elegans. The species was moved to the genus Geochelone by Peter Charles Howard Pritchard in 1967.

== Description ==
The Burmese star tortoise has radiating star-shaped patterns on its strongly domed carapace. It has bumps on its shell that look like stars. This tortoise can easily be distinguished from the more common Indian star tortoise by comparing the plastrons of the two species.

== Captive breeding ==
The breeding of the Burmese star tortoise is difficult, and its first successful breeding in captivity was in Taipei Zoo, Taiwan, where a few Burmese star tortoises were hatched in 2003.

Starting with 200 tortoises in 2004, by October 2017, there were 14,000 tortoises in breeding programs and 1000 have been reintroduced into the wild. On 31 July 2021, Richard Branson announced two baby Burmese star tortoises were born on his private island, Necker Island, as part of his ongoing conservation work for the species.

== Status ==
The Burmese star tortoise is endemic to Myanmar. Its 2018 IUCN Red List assessment listed it as a critically endangered species. It had briefly gone extinct in the wild, its population decreasing by 90% over three generations due to habitat loss and over-collecting by humans, before being reintroduced into a pair of closely guarded wildlife sanctuaries. Its 2023 IUCN Green Status of Species assessment deemed its wild population to still be critically depleted, but viewed the outlook for recovery to be good.
