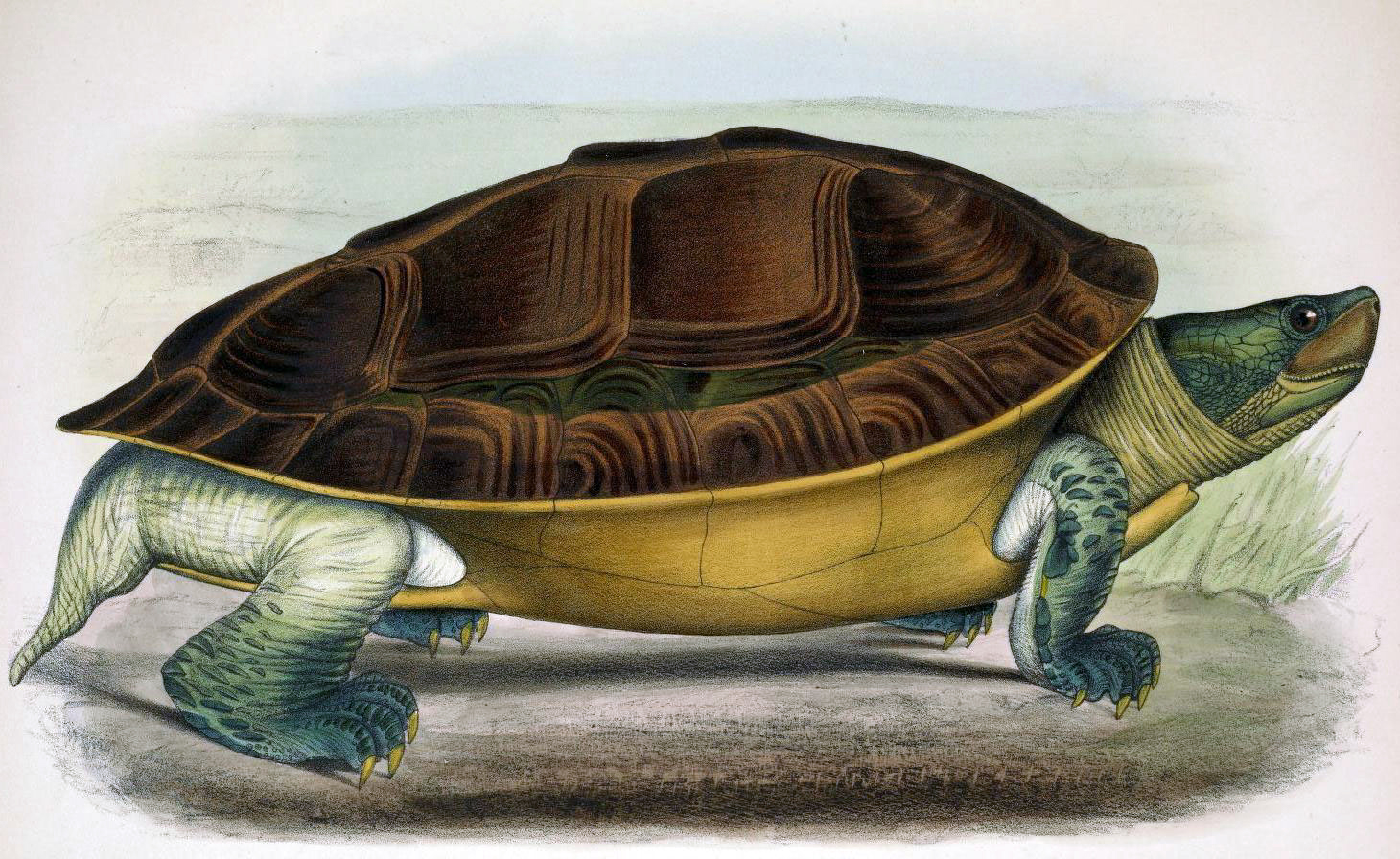
- Female

Conservation status
- Critically Endangered (IUCN 3.1)
- CITES Appendix II

Scientific classification
- Kingdom: Animalia
- Phylum: Chordata
- Class: Reptilia
- Order: Testudines
- Suborder: Cryptodira
- Family: Geoemydidae
- Genus: Batagur
- Species: B. trivittata

Binomial name
- Batagur trivittata (Duméril & Bibron, 1835)

Synonyms
- Emys trivittata Duméril & Bibron, 1835; Batagur trivittata Theobald, 1868; Kachuga peguensis Gray, 1869; Kachuga trilineata Gray, 1869; Kachuga fusca Gray, 1870; Batagur iravadica Anderson, 1879; Clemmys iravadica Boettger, 1888; Kachuga trivittata Boulenger, 1889; Kachuga (Pangshura) trivitata Gurley, 2003 (ex errore)

= Burmese roofed turtle =

Species of turtle

The Burmese roofed turtle (Batagur trivittata) is one of six turtle species in the genus Batagur of the family Geoemydidae. It is a freshwater turtle endemic to the rivers of Myanmar. Once common and abundant in its habitat, the species experienced a rapid decline and was believed to be extinct until two subpopulations were rediscovered in 2001 in the Chindwin and Dokhtawady rivers. By 2018, fewer than 10 mature individuals were documented. The Burmese roofed turtle is among the world's most endangered turtle species.

In 2007, an illegally traded Burmese roofed turtle was identified at Qingping market in Guangzhou, China, highlighting the ongoing threats of wildlife trafficking.

== Morphology ==
Adult male and female Burmese roofed turtles can be distinguished by their morphology. Adult males exhibit an olive-green carapace with a black stripe extending from the top of the head down the neck and three additional black stripes running along the carapace. They also have a more prominently elongated tail and an ivory-white plastron (underbelly). The male's typically green head transforms to a bright chartreuse-yellow with bold black markings during the breeding season. Female Burmese roofed turtles grow significantly larger than males. Adult females have a more uniform coloration, with the head, carapace, and plastron ranging from dark brown to grayish-black.

== Diet ==
B. trivittata is a herbivorous turtle; it feeds primarily on the aquatic and semi-aquatic vegetation found in its habitat. In captivity, B. trivitatta is fed water spinach, fish food pellets, figs when in season, and other supplemental foods as needed.

== Reproduction ==
A female Burmese roofed turtle in captivity is estimated to reproduce for the first time at a maximum age of 14 years. A wild female is likely to reach sexual maturity at around 20 years of age. The average number of eggs laid per clutch is between 20 and 25. These turtles remain in a deep pool, locally known as an 'Aike,' throughout the nesting season.

== Threats ==
Because B. trivittata is an endemic species, it faces many threats to its survival. The current main threats to the Burmese roofed turtles include habitat degradation, predation, excessive egg collection, poaching of mature adults and juveniles for consumption and trade demands, pollution, fishing, and climate change through flooding and extreme weather.

== Conservation ==
The Burmese roofed turtle is nationally protected and listed in CITES Appendix II. The captive population in five zoos comprised about 1,000 individuals as of 2018. Several hundred Burmese roofed turtles are kept in the Yadanabon Zoological Gardens in Mandalay and a turtle conservation center in Lawkananda Park, Bagan. Some have been released to the wild. Following the rediscovery of the species, researchers captured several Burmese roofed turtles to establish a conservation breeding program in captivity. Health screenings of captive Burmese roofed turtles were conducted in 2014 and 2018 to prevent the transmission of pathogens to wild populations upon release.These health screenings revealed no signs of disease or physical illness, confirming that the turtles were in excellent health.

=== Reintroductions ===
Because B. trivittata is a dispersive species, reintroduction efforts are more difficult since they will start to migrate downstream for miles. Some turtles have been released into the wild without any special assistance, but have been difficult to monitor. Soft release efforts have been implemented to assist B. trivittata in acclimating to the sandbank where they are released, preventing them from traveling long distances and making monitoring efforts easier.

Two groups of 30 genetically diverse B. trivittata individuals were reintroduced into the wild at two separate locations along the Chindwin River.

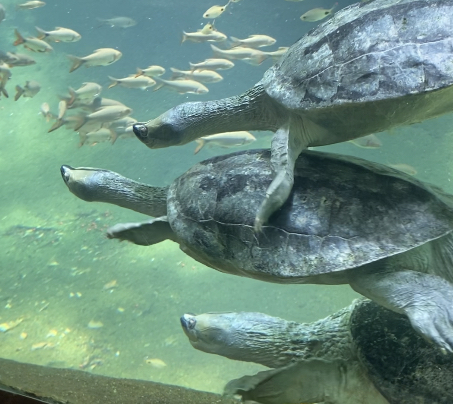
Burmese roofed turtles (Batagur trivittata) at the Singapore Zoo.
