= Black-bridged leaf turtle =

Black-bridged leaf turtle may refer to:

- Western black-bridged leaf turtle (Cyclemys atripons), an Asian leaf turtle found in Cambodia, East Thailand, and Vietnam
- Eastern black-bridged leaf turtle (Cyclemys pulchristiata), an Asian leaf turtle found in Eastern Cambodia and Vietnam

== See also ==
- Asian leaf turtles, turtles belonging to the genus Cyclemys.
