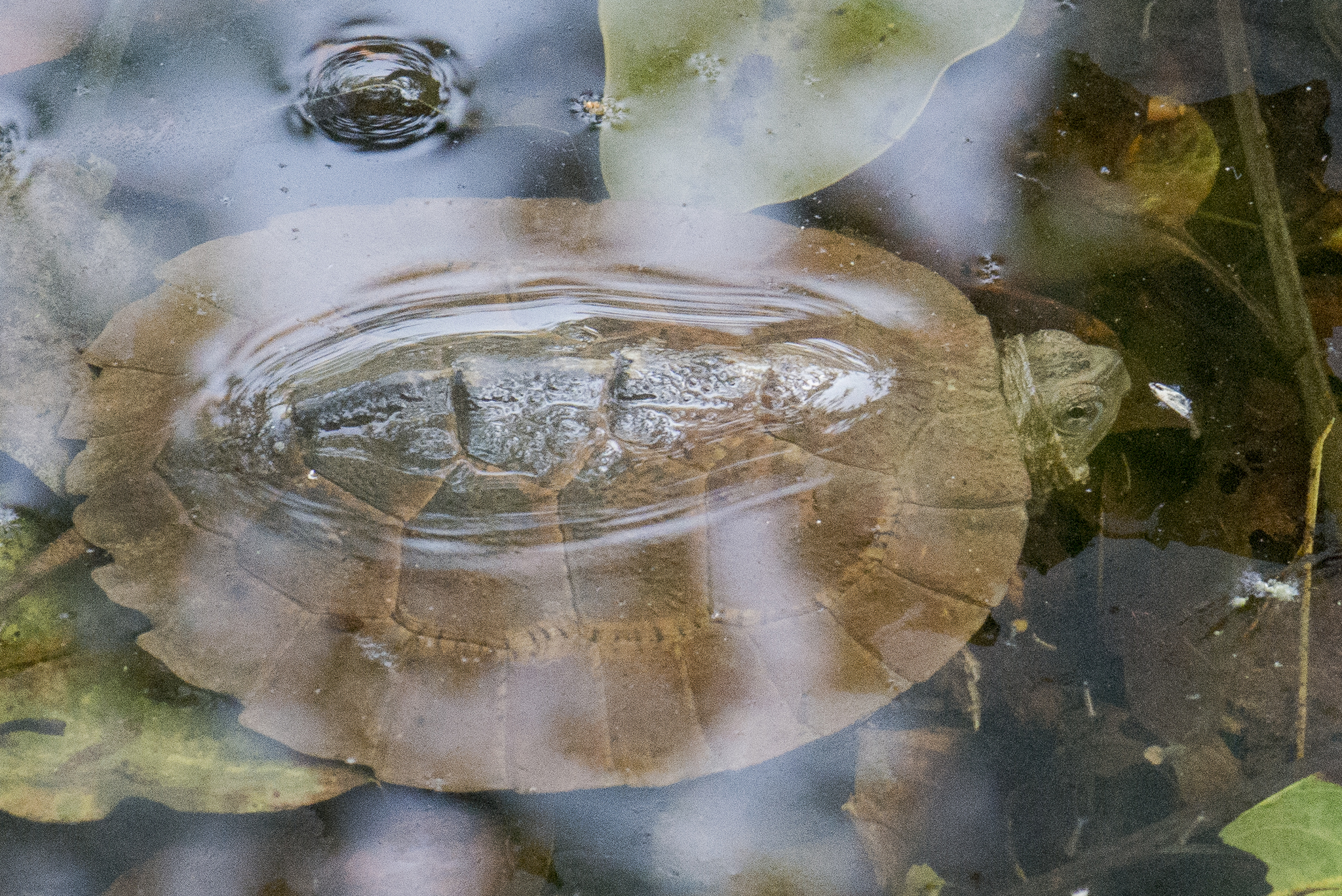

Conservation status
- Near Threatened (IUCN 3.1)
- CITES Appendix II

Scientific classification
- Kingdom: Animalia
- Phylum: Chordata
- Class: Reptilia
- Order: Testudines
- Suborder: Cryptodira
- Family: Geoemydidae
- Genus: Cyclemys
- Species: C. gemeli

Binomial name
- Cyclemys gemeli Uwe Fritz, Guicking, Auer, Sommer, Wink & Hundsdörfer, 2008
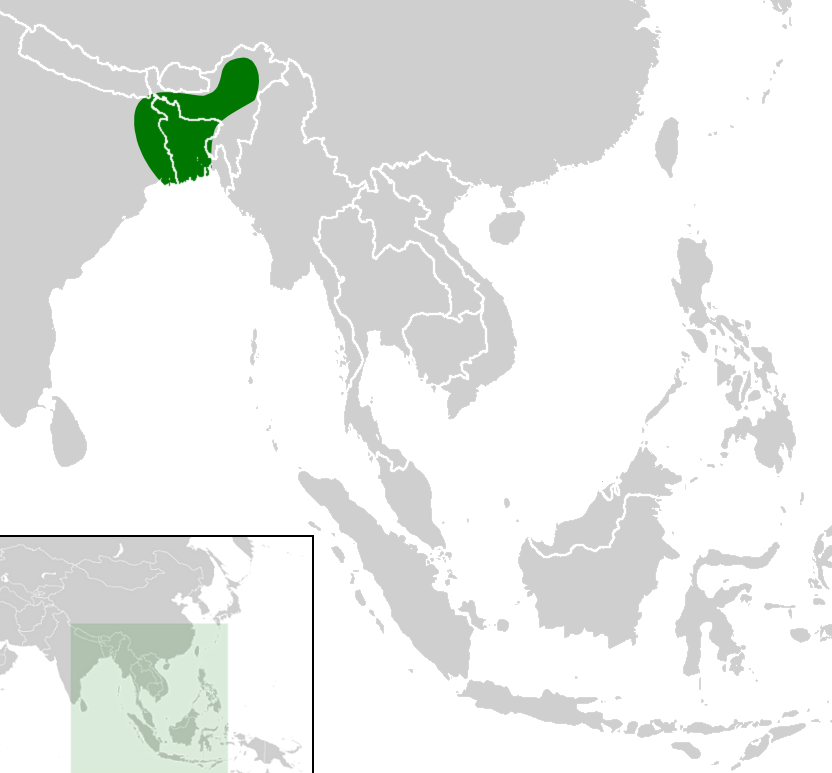
- Cyclemys gemeli range map

Synonyms
- Cyclemys gameli Das et al., 2009 (ex errore); Cyclemys gemelli Malsawmdawngliana et al., 2022 (ex errore)

= Assam leaf turtle =

Species of turtle

The Assam leaf turtle (Cyclemys gemeli) is a species of turtle in the family Geoemydidae. The species is found in India, Nepal, Bhutan, Bangladesh and Myanmar.

== Systematics ==
The species was first described, alongside C. fusca and C. enigmatica, in 2008 by Uwe Fritz, Daniela Guicking, Markus Auer, Robert S. Sommer, Michael Wink and Anna K. Hundsdörfer. The specific name, gemeli, is in honor of Austrian herpetologist Richard Gemel, who collected the holotype (Note: Identifier NMW 37153; held at the Natural History Museum, Vienna.) for the species in 2003. The type locality is given by Gemel as "street from Tezpur to Arunachal Pradesh, 5 km to border of Arunachal Pradesh, Jia Bhoroli River Region, Assam, India."

The populations that constitute C. gemeli and C. fusca were considered to belong to C. oldhami (C. enigmatica instead to C. dentata) prior to the 2008 study that first described them. The species were able to be separated from each other thanks in part to a molecular phylogenetics analysis and in part to a morpholological assessment. The molecular phylogenetic analysis concluded that C. gemeli and C. fusca constituted a sister group to the rest of Cyclemys.

== Description ==
The carapace of the Assam leaf turtle lacks patterns in adults. It is elongated and relatively flat, with nearly parallel sides. The plastron and is unpatterned and dark brown. The bridge is also dark brown. The head is brown, and the throat and neck are uniformly dark.

The turtle reaches sexual maturity at around five years of age, and has a generation time of around fifteen years.

== Distribution and habitat ==
The Assam leaf turtle is found in northeastern India, Nepal, Bhutan, Bangladesh and western Myanmar. Its preferred habitats are freshwater wetlands and forest, often found in streams with boulders in hilly areas, but also on forest floor in connection to dry river beds, in slow-moving rivers and in oxbow lakes. Due to a suspected decline in population as a result of ongoing habitat loss, the 2018 IUCN Red List assessment for the Assam leaf turtle listed it as a near-threatened species.
