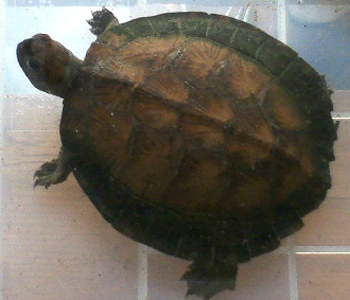

Conservation status
- Near Threatened (IUCN 3.1)
- CITES Appendix II

Scientific classification
- Kingdom: Animalia
- Phylum: Chordata
- Class: Reptilia
- Order: Testudines
- Suborder: Cryptodira
- Family: Geoemydidae
- Genus: Cyclemys
- Species: C. enigmatica

Binomial name
- Cyclemys enigmatica Fritz, Guicking, Auer, Sommer, Wink & Hundsdörfer, 2008
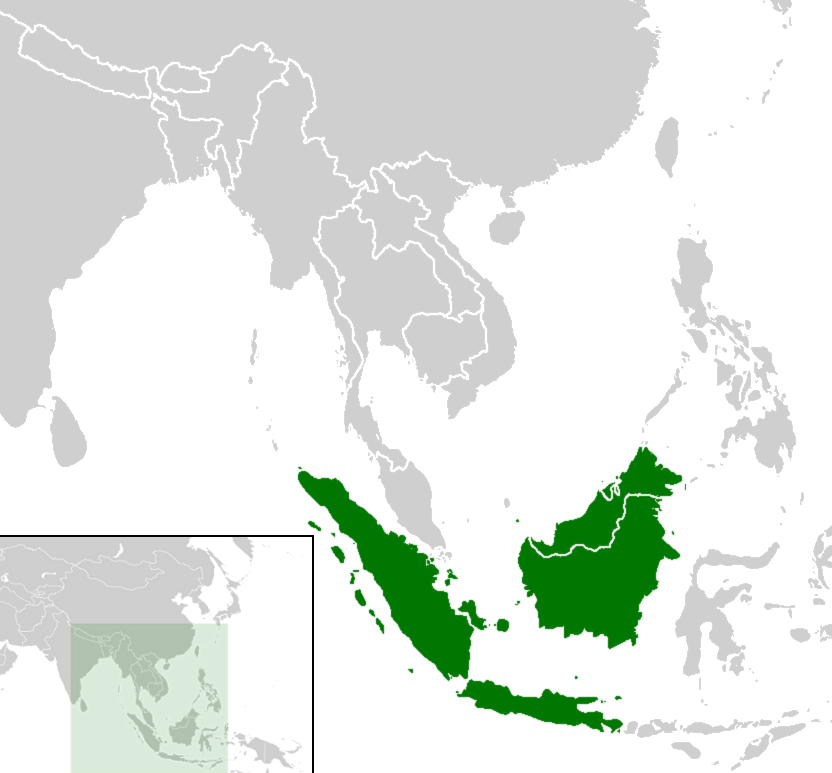
- Cyclemys enigmatica range map

= Enigmatic leaf turtle =

Species of turtle

Cyclemys enigmatica, also known as the enigmatic leaf turtle, is a species of turtle in the family Geoemydidae. It is found in the Greater Sunda Islands and on the Malay Peninsula.

== Taxonomy ==
The species was first described, alongside C. gemeli and C. fusca, in 2008 by Uwe Fritz, Daniela Guicking, Markus Auer, Robert S. Sommer, Michael Wink and Anna K. Hundsdörfer. The type locality is "Padang, Sumatra", in Indonesia. The specific name enigmatica and common name "Enigmatic leaf turtle" are in reference to the confusion that the species' caused for researchers.

Prior to the description of C. enigmatica, the population that constitutes it was considered to be part of C. dentata. Morphological differences within the pre-split C. dentata population were able to be identified, suggesting that it was infact composed of two separate taxa, but when mitochondrial DNA of members of the pre-split C. dentata were analyzed no discernable differences within the population that would be expected for separate taxa could be found. The cause for this discrepancy was determined to be that C. enigmatica, while a separate species, had lost its original mitochondrial genome due to introgressive hybridization.

== Description ==
In the enigmatic leaf turtle, the carapace is dark brown and slightly reddish, ovoid, and lacks patterns in adults. The plastron is dark brown to black with or without dense, black, radiating patterns. The head is tan to a light reddish-brown in color. The throat and neck are uniformly dark. The bridge is dark brown to black. Hatchlings lack head and neck stripes and have brownish, mottled plastrons.

== Distribution and habitat ==
The Enigmatic leaf turtle is found in Southeast Asia, on the Malay Peninsula in Thailand and Malaysia, in Singapore and in Indonesia, on the western Riau Islands, the Bangka Belitung Islands, Borneo, Sumatra, Java and various other nearby islands of the Malay Archipelago. Its distribution generally overlaps that of the Asian leaf turtle (C. dentata). It is a mainly aquatic species with a natural habitat consisting of freshwater watercourses and wetlands in primary and secondary forests, primarily ones in lowlands, usually inhabiting closed-canopy areas of forest.

Threats to the species include human exploitation and habitat loss. The 2018 IUCN Red List assessment for the Enigmatic leaf turtle listed it as a near-threatened species; however, the assessment stated that this was due to that being the classification of the Asian leaf turtle and that although it was likely that the Enigmatic leaf turtle was a vulnerable species on account of it facing the same exploitation and habitat pressures as the Asian leaf turtle while having a smaller distribution than it, there was insufficient data to justify a change of classification from the population it was previously considered a part of.
