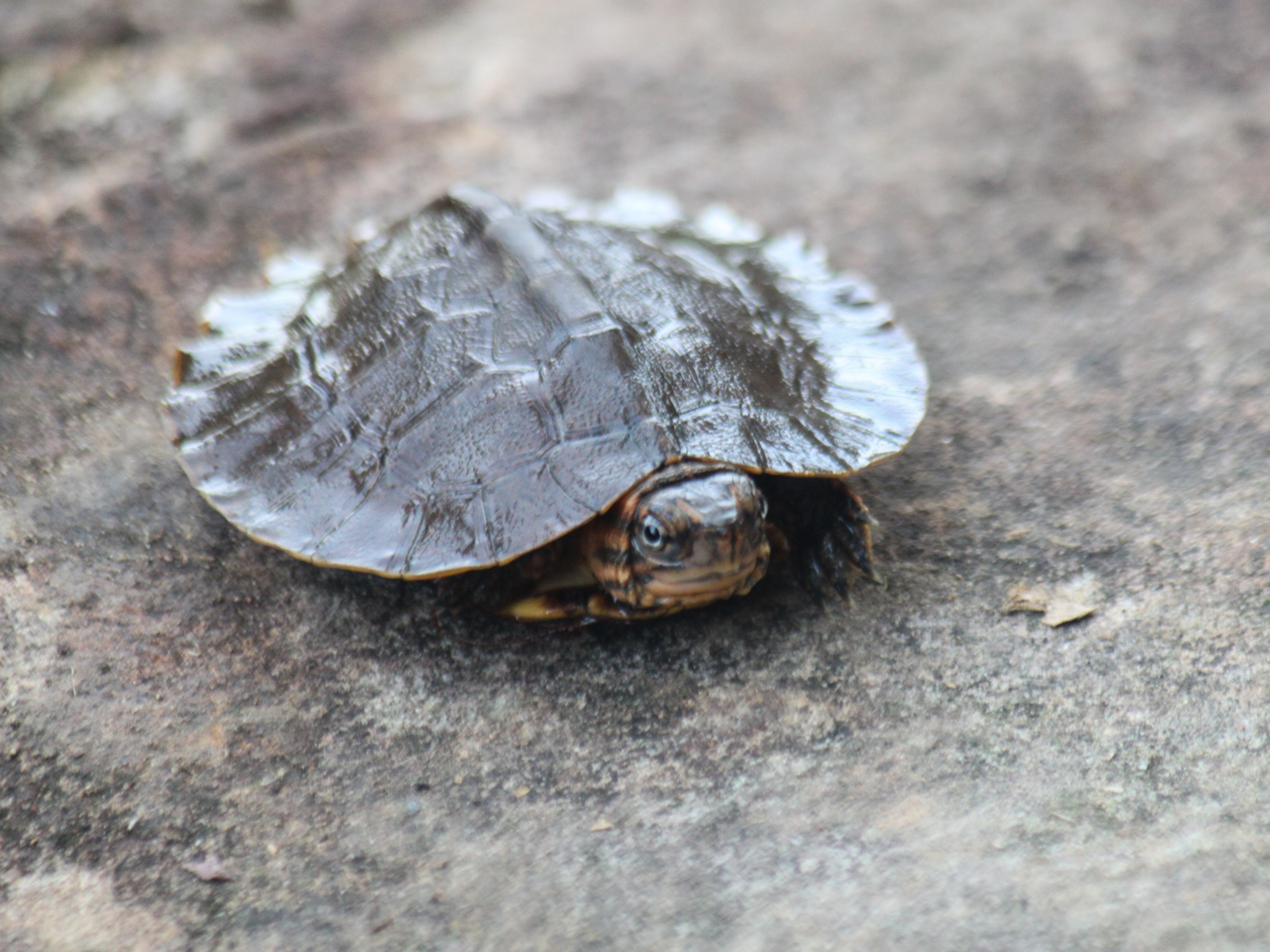
- seen in Kaôh Kong, Cambodia

Conservation status
- Endangered (IUCN 3.1)
- CITES Appendix II

Scientific classification
- Kingdom: Animalia
- Phylum: Chordata
- Class: Reptilia
- Order: Testudines
- Suborder: Cryptodira
- Family: Geoemydidae
- Genus: Cyclemys
- Species: C. atripons

Binomial name
- Cyclemys atripons J. B. Iverson & W. P. McCord, 1997
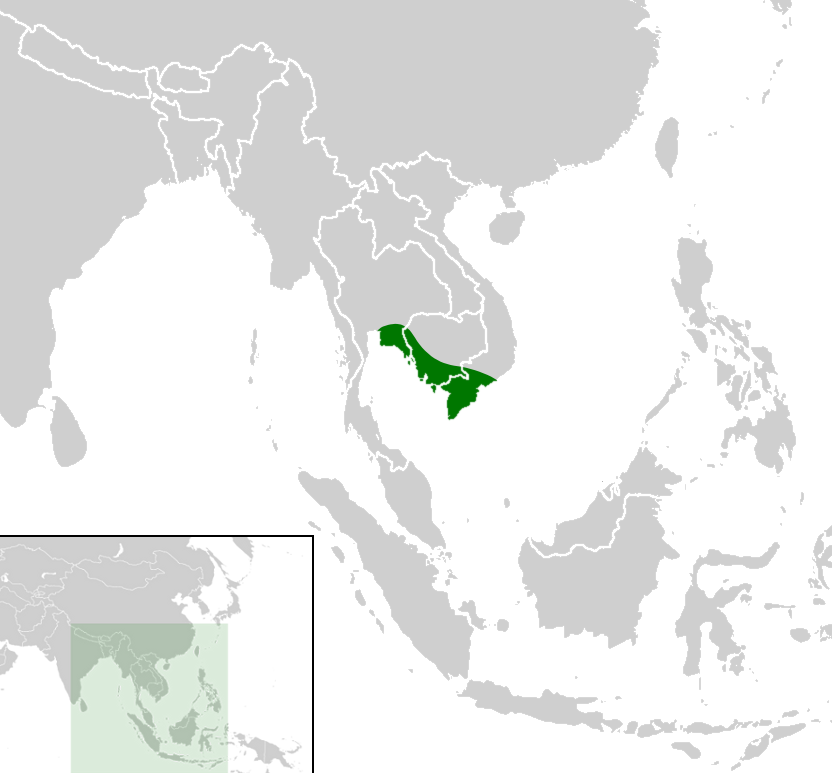
- Cyclemys atripons range map

Synonyms
- Cyclemys atripons atripons Vetter in Vetter & Van Dijk, 2006

= Western black-bridged leaf turtle =

Species of turtle

The western black-bridged leaf turtle (Cyclemys atripons), also known as the striped leaf turtle, is a species of Asian leaf turtle. It is endemic to southern Indochina, being found in Thailand, Cambodia and Vietnam, where it primarily inhabits calm watercourses in evergreen forests in hilly regions. Due to habitat loss and excessive collection by humans, the IUCN Red List has it classed as an endangered species.

== Systematics ==
The species was first described in 1997 by John B. Iverson and William Patrick McCord. The type locality is "Thailand, Krat Kao Kuap" (Mount Khao Kuap, Trat, Thailand). The specific name atripons is derived from the Latin atra 'black' and pons 'bridge', a reference to the black markings found on the turtle's bridge.

Some authors have considered C. pulchristriata to be a subspecies of C. atripons, but it has turned out that, despite being essentially morphologically indistinguishable, the two species are paraphyletic with respect to C dentata.

== Description ==
The western black-bridged leaf turtle has a maximum recorded straight carapace length of 19.5 cm (7.7 in) in males and 23.6 cm (9.3 in) in females. The carapace is reddish brown, ovoid to elongated, with or without fine, radiating, black patterns. The plastron is mostly yellow with or without fine, radiating, black lines. The head is speckled and the throat is yellow. The neck is striped. Hatchlings have wide head and neck stripes and yellow plastrons with large, dark spots. The common name of the species refers to the color of the bridge (the area where the plastron and the carapace meet), which is predominantly yellow with black stripes or entirely black. C. atripons is morphologically almost indistinguishable from C. pulchristiata, the eastern black-bridged leaf turtle.

The turtle reaches maturity at about 11 years of age, and can live for up to about 25 years. The generation time is estimated to be between 20 and 25 years.

== Distribution and habitat ==
The western black-bridged leaf turtle is endemic to southern Indochina, being found in southern Cambodia, eastern Thailand, and southern Vietnam.

It primarily inhabits calm watercourses in evergreen forests in hilly regions, but has also been found in seasonally inundated coastal forests, slow-moving rivers, lakes and ponds. It lives at elevations of up to 1,000 m (3,300 ft).

The western black-bridged leaf turtle is threatened by habitat loss and excessive collection by humans, and its 2018 IUCN Red List assessment inferred that its population was in decline, listing it as an endangered species.
