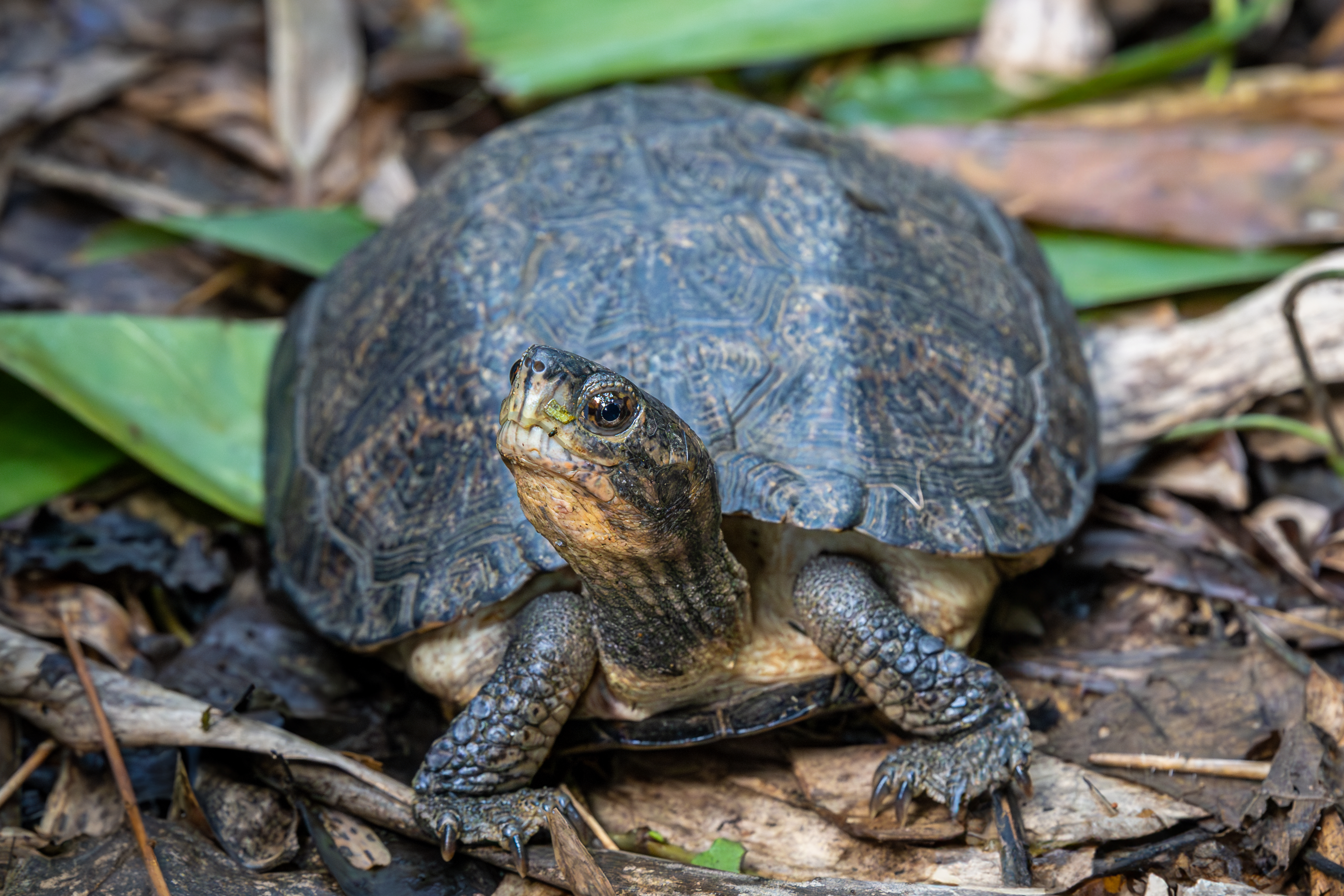
- Cyclemys pulchristriata; Turtle Conservation Center, Cuc-Phuong, Vietnam

Conservation status
- Endangered (IUCN 3.1)
- CITES Appendix II

Scientific classification
- Kingdom: Animalia
- Phylum: Chordata
- Class: Reptilia
- Order: Testudines
- Suborder: Cryptodira
- Family: Geoemydidae
- Genus: Cyclemys
- Species: C. pulchristriata

Binomial name
- Cyclemys pulchristriata Fritz, Gaulke & Lehr, 1997
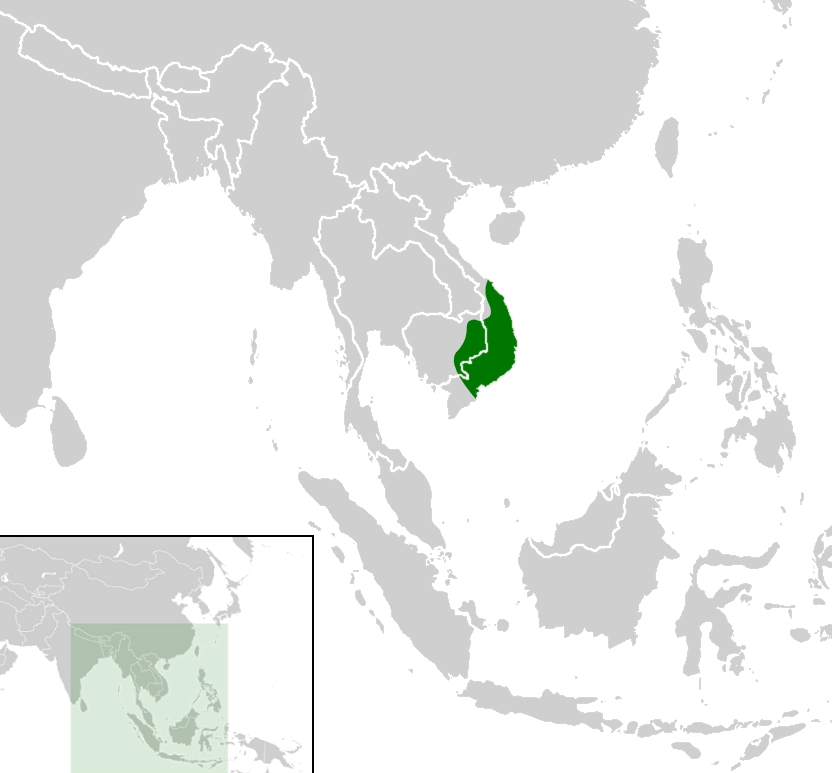
- Cyclemys pulchristriata range map

Synonyms
- Cyclemys pulchristriata Fritz, Gaulke & Lehr, 1997; Cyclemys pulchistriata – Hallermann, Dirksen & Uetz, 1999 (ex errore); Cyclemys pulchristata – Das, 2005 (ex errore); Cyclemys atripons pulchristriata – Vetter, 2006

= Eastern black-bridged leaf turtle =

Species of turtle

The eastern black-bridged leaf turtle (Cyclemys pulchristriata) is a species of Asian leaf turtles found in southern Indochina.

== Systematics ==
The species was first described in 1997 by Uwe Fritz, Maren Gaulke and Edgar Lehr. The type locality is "Phuc-Son, Annam, Vietnam" (Phước Sơn, Quảng Nam). The specific name pulchristriata is derived from the Latin pulcher 'beautiful' and striatus 'striped', a reference to the "striking" colour pattern of the species, compared to its Cyclemys relatives (other than C. atripons).

Some authors have considered the species to be a junior synonym to or a subspecies of C. atripons, but it has turned out that, despite being essentially morphologically indistinguishable, the two species are paraphyletic with respect to C. dentata.

== Description ==
The eastern black-bridged leaf turtle has a carapace that is reddish brown, ovoid to elongated, with wide, radiating, black lines or large, black specks. The plastron is mostly yellow and may have short, fat lines, specks, or be uniformly colored. The head is speckled, with a yellow throat. The neck is striped. Hatchlings have wide head and neck stripes and yellow plastrons. The bridge is predominantly yellow with black stripes or entirely black. It is mostly morphologically indistinguishable from the western black-bridged leaf turtle, C. atripons, requiring genetic sampling to confidently identify.

The species reaches maturity at 5–7 years of age, and can likely live for over 50 years. The generation time is estimated to be 26 years.

== Distribution and habitat ==
The eastern black-bridged leaf turtle is endemic to southeastern Indochina, only being known to inhabit eastern Cambodia and in southern and central Vietnam. It is considered possible but unlikely that the species also inhabits Laos.

The turtle inhabits streams, mainly smaller ones, in forests, with individual ranges extending widely into nearby forested areas, including disturbed forests. It has been recorded living at elevations of up to 700 m (2,300 ft), and is thought to occur at greater elevations.
