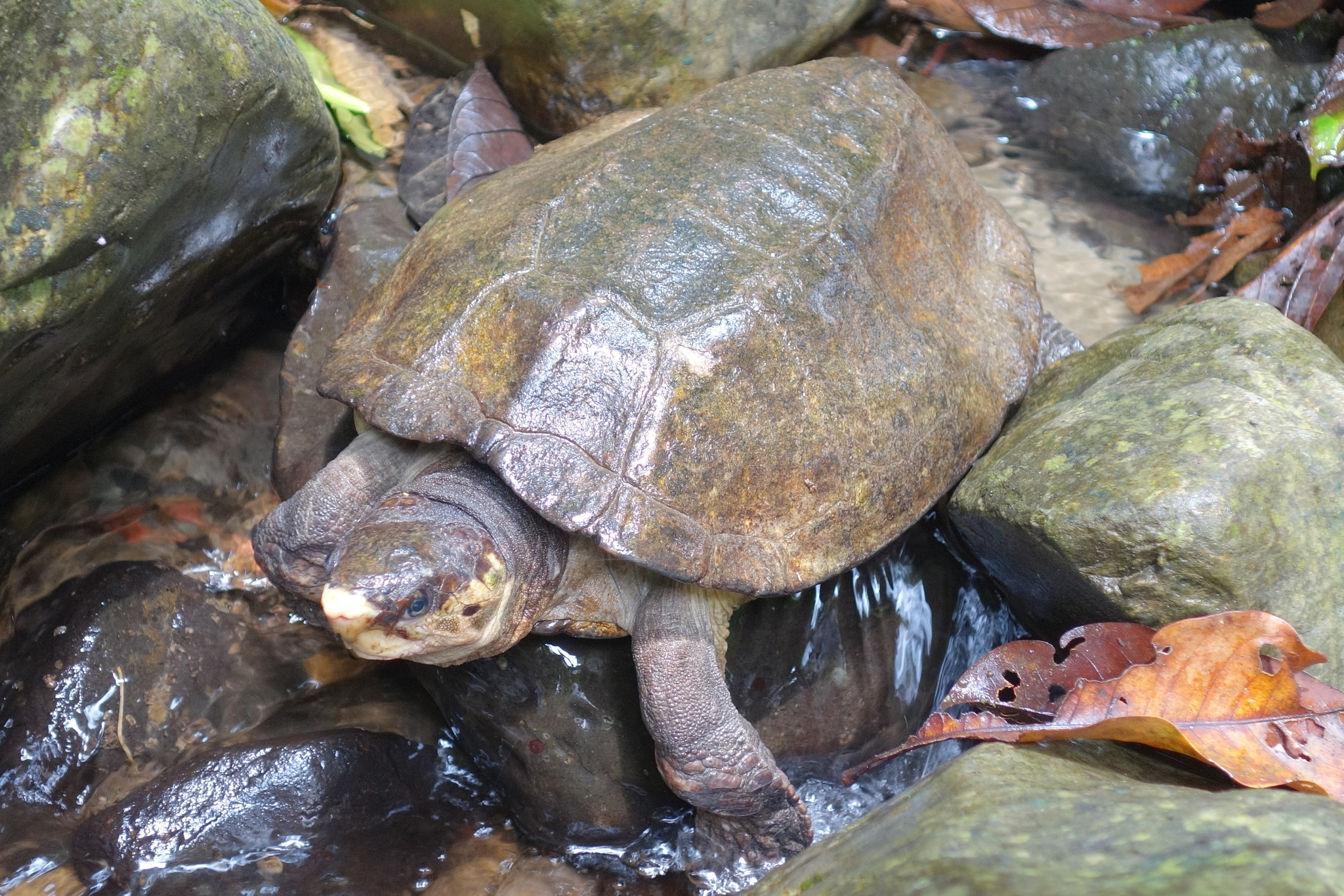
- In Indonesia
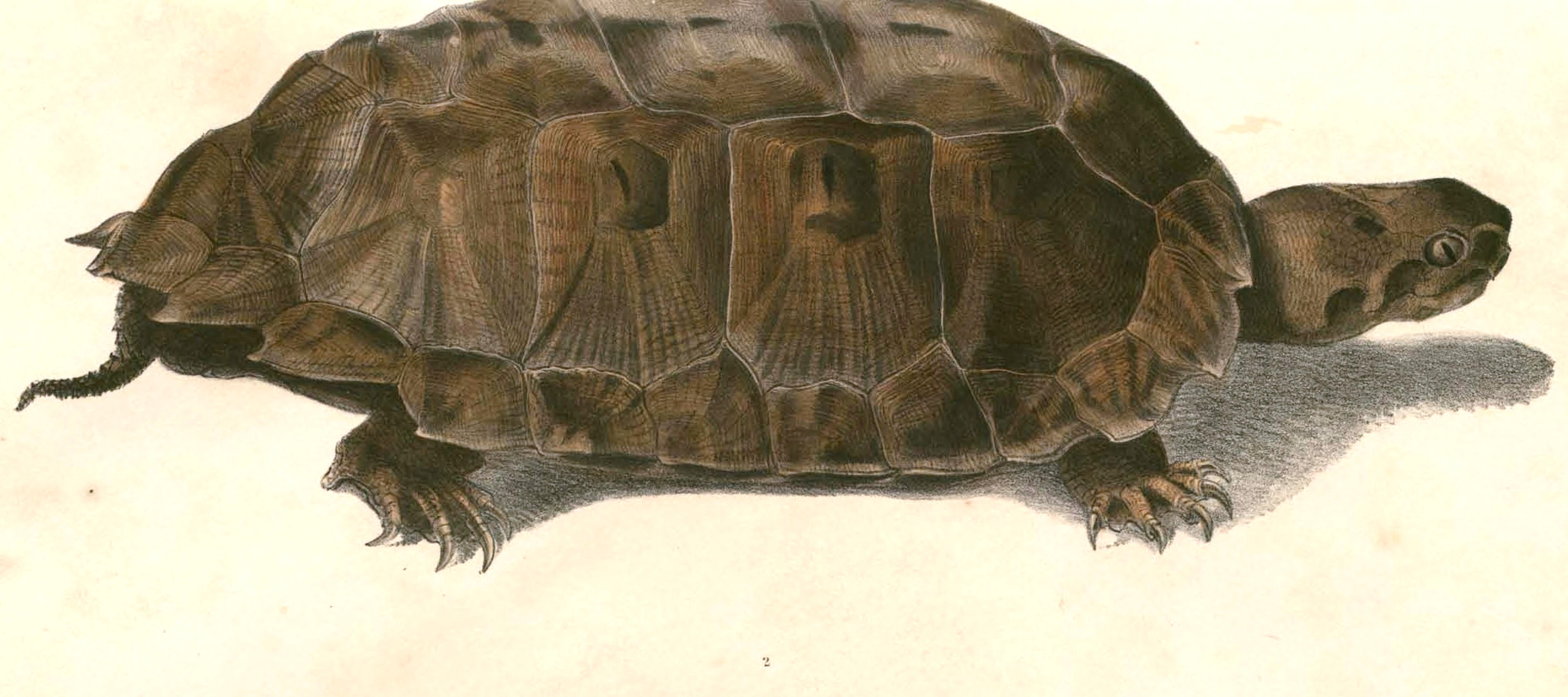
- 1833-1834 illustration

Conservation status
- Vulnerable (IUCN 3.1)
- CITES Appendix II

Scientific classification
- Kingdom: Animalia
- Phylum: Chordata
- Class: Reptilia
- Order: Testudines
- Suborder: Cryptodira
- Family: Geoemydidae
- Subfamily: Geoemydinae
- Genus: Notochelys; Gray, 1863
- Species: N. platynota

Binomial name
- Notochelys platynota (Gray, 1834)

Synonyms
- Emys platynota Gray, 1834; Emys platynotha Gray, 1835 (ex errore); Cyclemys platynota Gray, 1856; Notochelys platynota Gray, 1863; Cyclemys giebelii Hubrecht, 1881; Cistudo bankanensis Bleeker, 1889 (nomen nudum); Notochelys platysnota Nutaphand, 1979 (ex errore)

= Malayan flat-shelled turtle =

Species of turtle

The Malayan flat-shelled turtle (Notochelys platynota) is a species of turtle in the family Geoemydidae. It is found in Southeast Asia. It is the only member of the monotypic genus Notochelys.

== Taxonomy ==
The species was first described in 1834 by John Edward Gray, who originally placed it in the genus Emys, moving it to Cyclemys in 1856 and then establishing the monotypic genus Notochelys for the species in 1863. He originally gave the type locality as "Indiâ Orientali", but later restricted it to Sumatra. The generic name Notochelys is derived from the Greek notos 'back' (in the anatomical sense) and chelys 'turtle', while the specific name platynota is derived from the Greek platys 'flat, broad, wide' and, again, notos, a reference to the turtle's carapace having a flat top.

== Distribution and habitat ==
The Malayan flat-shell turtle is native to Southeast Asia, being found on the Malay Peninsula and in the Malay Archipelago. On the Malay Peninsula its range reaches up through Malaysia and Thailand to the southernmost parts of Myanmar. In the Malay Archipelago it can be found in Singapore, in each of Malaysia, Brunei and Indonesia on Borneo, and in Indonesia also on the Bunguran Islands, the Bangka Belitung Islands, Sumatra, the Mentawai Islands, and Java.

The species' naturally inhabits terrestrial freshwater habitats, being found in lowland forests and wetlands, including streams and small creeks. It can also be found in artificial habitats in the form of canals at oil palm plantations in Indonesia.

The species' population has experienced a decline, estimated at 30% over the previous 3 generations by its 2018 IUCN Red List assessment, due to being hunted for its meat by humans. It is, however, not a preferred species for the trade, due to a poor survival rate when being transported. In addition to this, there is a minor pet trade for the species, and there is also potential for it to face habitat loss as a result of the agriculture industry. These factors led the IUCN Red List assessment to list the turtle as a vulnerable species.
