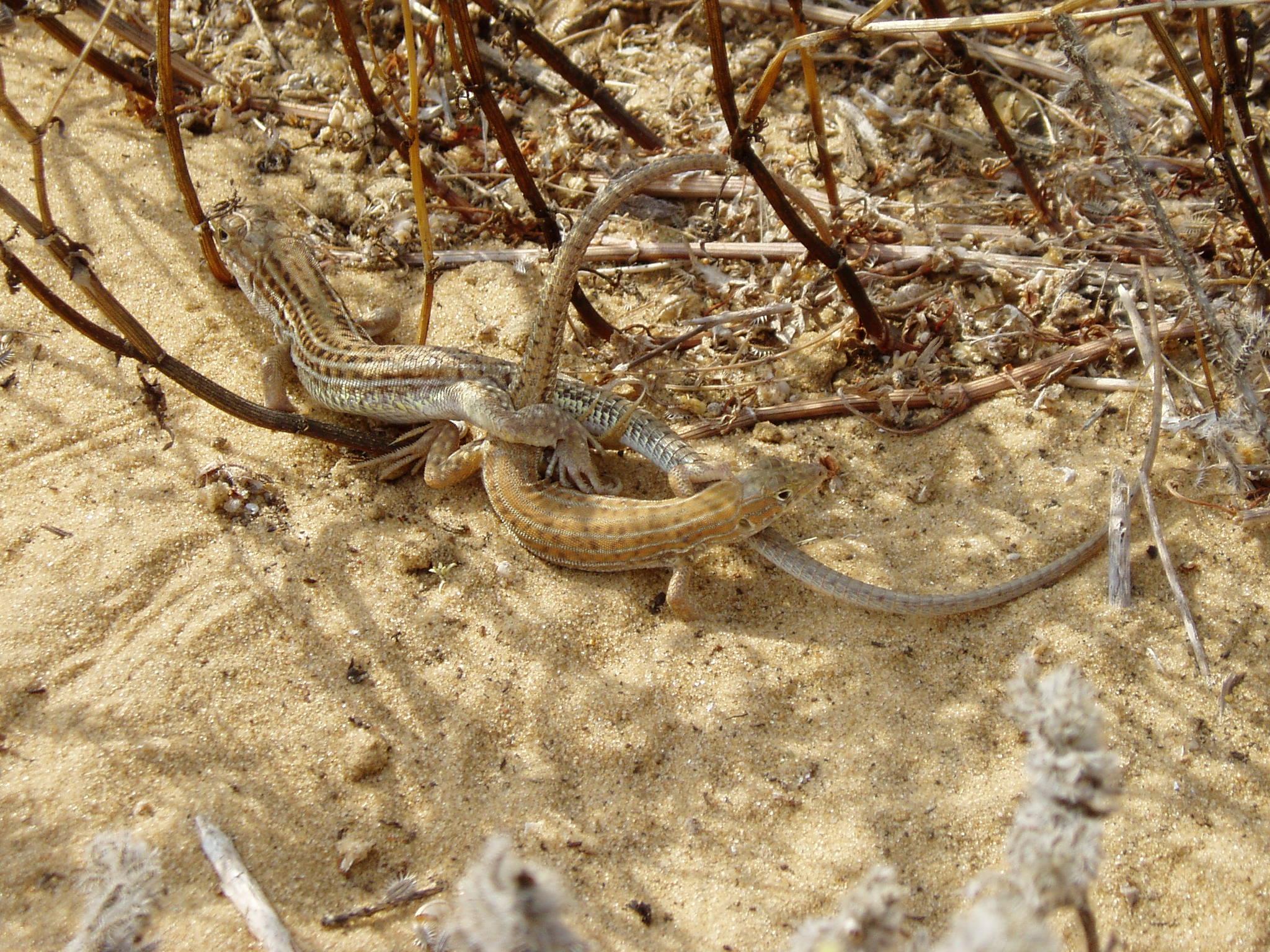

Conservation status
- Least Concern (IUCN 3.1)

Scientific classification
- Kingdom: Animalia
- Phylum: Chordata
- Class: Reptilia
- Order: Squamata
- Family: Lacertidae
- Genus: Acanthodactylus
- Species: A. schreiberi

Binomial name
- Acanthodactylus schreiberi Boulenger, 1878

Synonyms
- Acanthodactylus savignyi var. schreiberii Boulenger, 1878; Acanthodactylus schreiberi — Boulenger, 1887

= Schreiber's fringe-fingered lizard =

Species of lizard

Schreiber's fringe-fingered lizard (Acanthodactylus schreiberi) is a species of lizard in the family Lacertidae. The species is endemic to Cyprus.

== Etymology ==
Both the specific name, schreiberi, and the common name, Schreiber's fringe-fingered lizard, are in honor of Austrian zoologist Egid Schreiber (1836-1913), author of Herpetologia Europaea (1875).

== Geographic range ==
A. schreiberi is endemic to Cyprus.

== Habitat ==
The natural habitats of Schreiber's fringe-fingered lizard are sandy shores, pastureland, and plantations.

== Reproduction ==
A. schreiberi is oviparous.

== Conservation status ==
A. schreiberi is threatened by habitat loss because of residential and commercial development.
