= Uwe Fritz =

- Born: 31 October 1963; Backnang, West Germany
- Education: University of Hohenheim
- Known for: Research on turtles; systematics and genetics of Chelonians
- Scientific career
- Fields: Herpetology
- Workplaces: State Museum of Zoology, Dresden
- Thesis: (1996)
- Doctoral advisor: Hinrich Rahmann

Uwe Fritz (born 31 October 1963) is a German zoologist specializing in herpetology, particularly in the study of turtles.

== Career ==
From 1982 to 1989, Fritz held a scholarship from the Studienstiftung des deutschen Volkes (German National Academic Foundation). Between 1985 and 1989 he studied for a diploma in biology at the University of Hohenheim in Stuttgart. From 1990 to 1996 he worked as curator at the aquarium building of the Zoological and Botanical Garden Wilhelma in Stuttgart. In 1996, under the supervision of Hinrich Rahmann, he earned his doctorate (Doctor rerum naturalium) at the University of Hohenheim.

That same year, he became curator of herpetology at the State Museum of Zoology, Dresden. In 1997 he was appointed deputy director of the museum and lecturer in vertebrate morphology and systematics at the Faculty of Biosciences, Pharmacy, and Psychology at the University of Leipzig. In 2000 he became head of the vertebrate department and, in 2001, director of the Museum of Zoology Dresden. In 2004 he completed his habilitation and received teaching authorization at the University of Leipzig. From 2005 to 2009 he was executive director of the Senckenberg Natural History Collections Dresden. In 2008 he became adjunct professor at the University of Leipzig, and since 2009 he has been a member of the Senckenberg Directorate, responsible for collections and scientific journals.

== Research ==
Fritz has been co-author of at least thirteen turtle species descriptions, including Cuora picturata, Cyclemys enigmatica, Cyclemys fusca, Cyclemys gemeli, Pelomedusa barbata, Emys trinacris (the Sicilian pond turtle), and Trachemys medemi.

In 2013, Fritz and colleagues demonstrated through DNA analysis that the subspecies Pelusios subniger parietalis from the Seychelles is not a distinct taxon, but rather consists of individuals of the nominate form Pelusios subniger from the African mainland that were introduced to the Seychelles by humans.

That same year, Fritz co-authored a DNA study revealing that the supposedly extinct species Pelusios seychellensis from the Seychelles was a misidentification. The species was known only from three specimens collected in 1895 on the island of Mahé. DNA sequencing showed that the specimens actually belong to Pelusios castaneus from the African mainland, meaning that Pelusios seychellensis was never a valid species.

== Published books ==
In addition to numerous scientific papers, Fritz has authored and edited several books on turtles, including:

- Handbuch der Reptilien und Amphibien Europas, Schildkröten I (Land- und Sumpfschildkröten) Bataguridae, Testudinidae (2001)
- Die Europäische Sumpfschildkröte (2003)
- Proceedings of the 3rd International Symposium on Emys orbicularis (2004)
- Handbuch der Reptilien und Amphibien Europas, Band 3 Schildkröten II Meeresschildkröten (2005)
- Checklist of Chelonians of the World (2007)
- Die Schildkröten Europas (2012)
