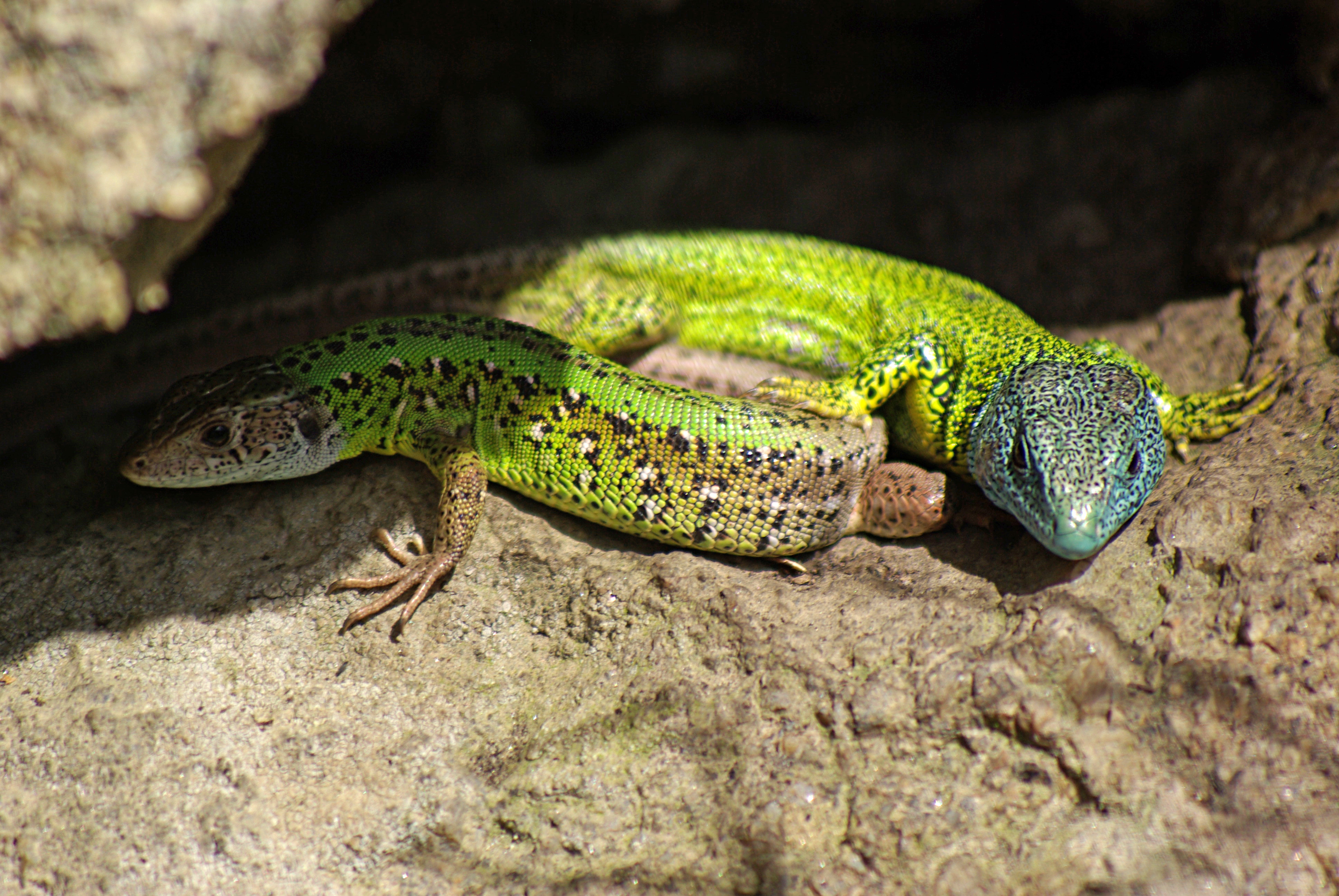
- Iberian emerald lizard male on the back, female on the front

Conservation status
- Near Threatened (IUCN 3.1)

Scientific classification
- Kingdom: Animalia
- Phylum: Chordata
- Class: Reptilia
- Order: Squamata
- Family: Lacertidae
- Genus: Lacerta
- Species: L. schreiberi

Binomial name
- Lacerta schreiberi Bedriaga, 1878
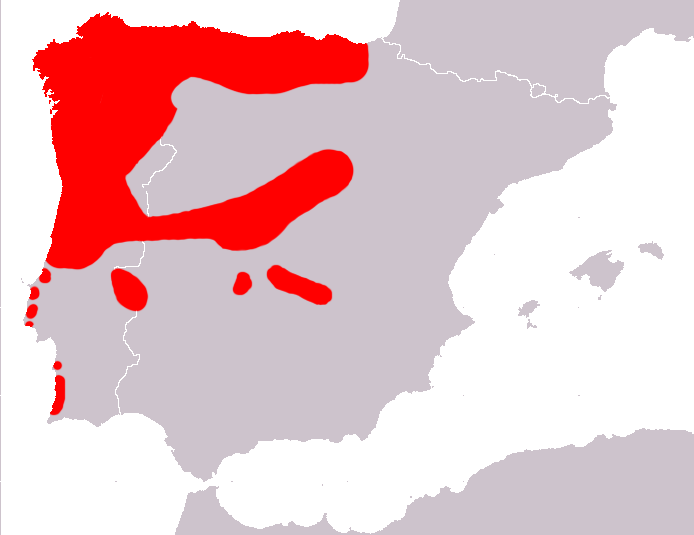

= Iberian emerald lizard =

Species of lizard

The Iberian emerald lizard (Lacerta schreiberi), also known commonly as Schreiber's green lizard, is a species of lizard in the family Lacertidae. The species is endemic to the Iberian Peninsula.

== Etymology ==
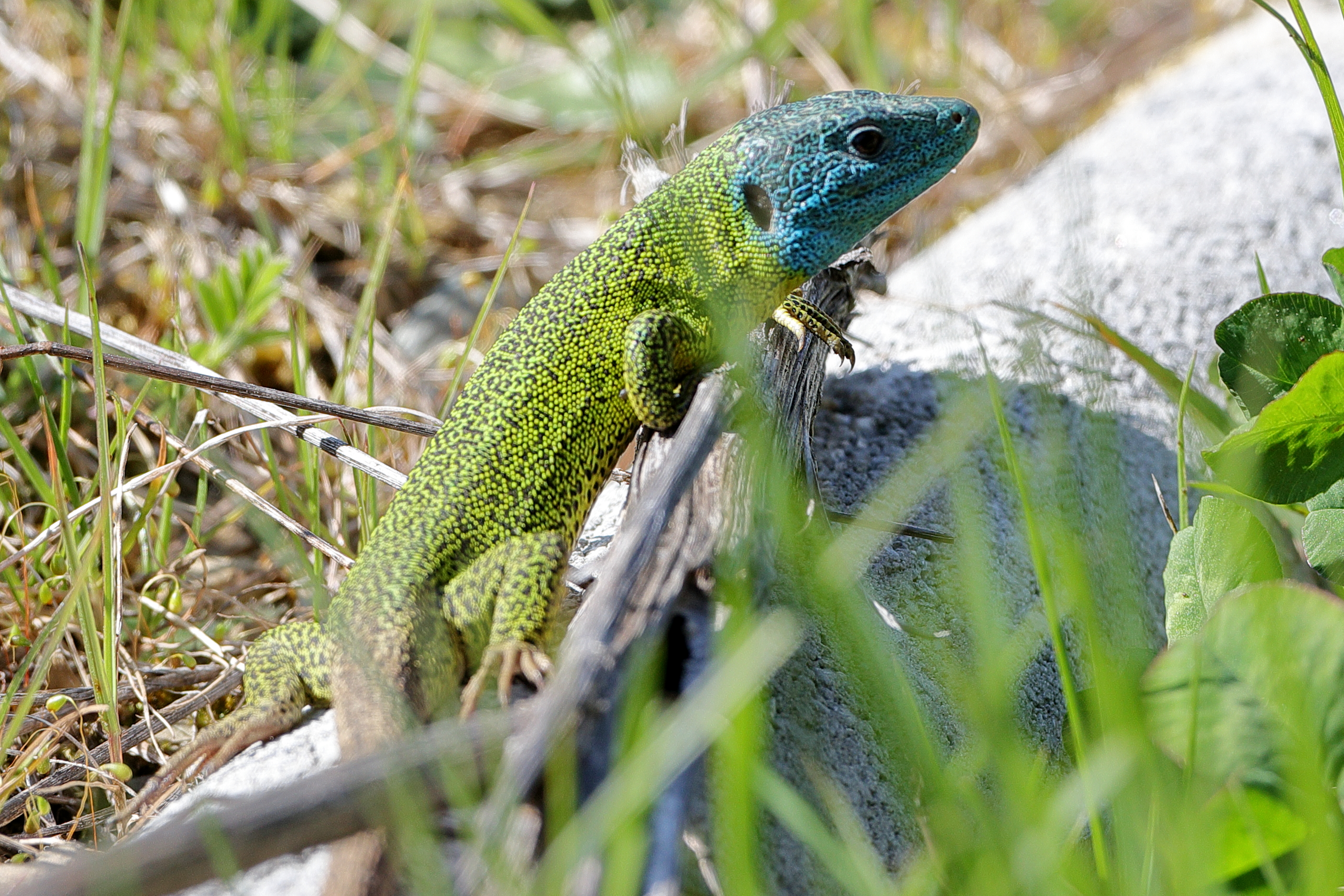
Male lizard

The specific name, schreiberi, is in honor of Austrian zoologist Egid Schreiber (1836–1913), author of Herpetologia Europaea (1875).

It is known as Lagarto-de-água (water lizard) in Portuguese and lagarto verdinegro (green and black lizard) in Spanish.

== Geographic range ==
Lacerta schreiberi is found in Portugal and Spain.

== Habitat ==
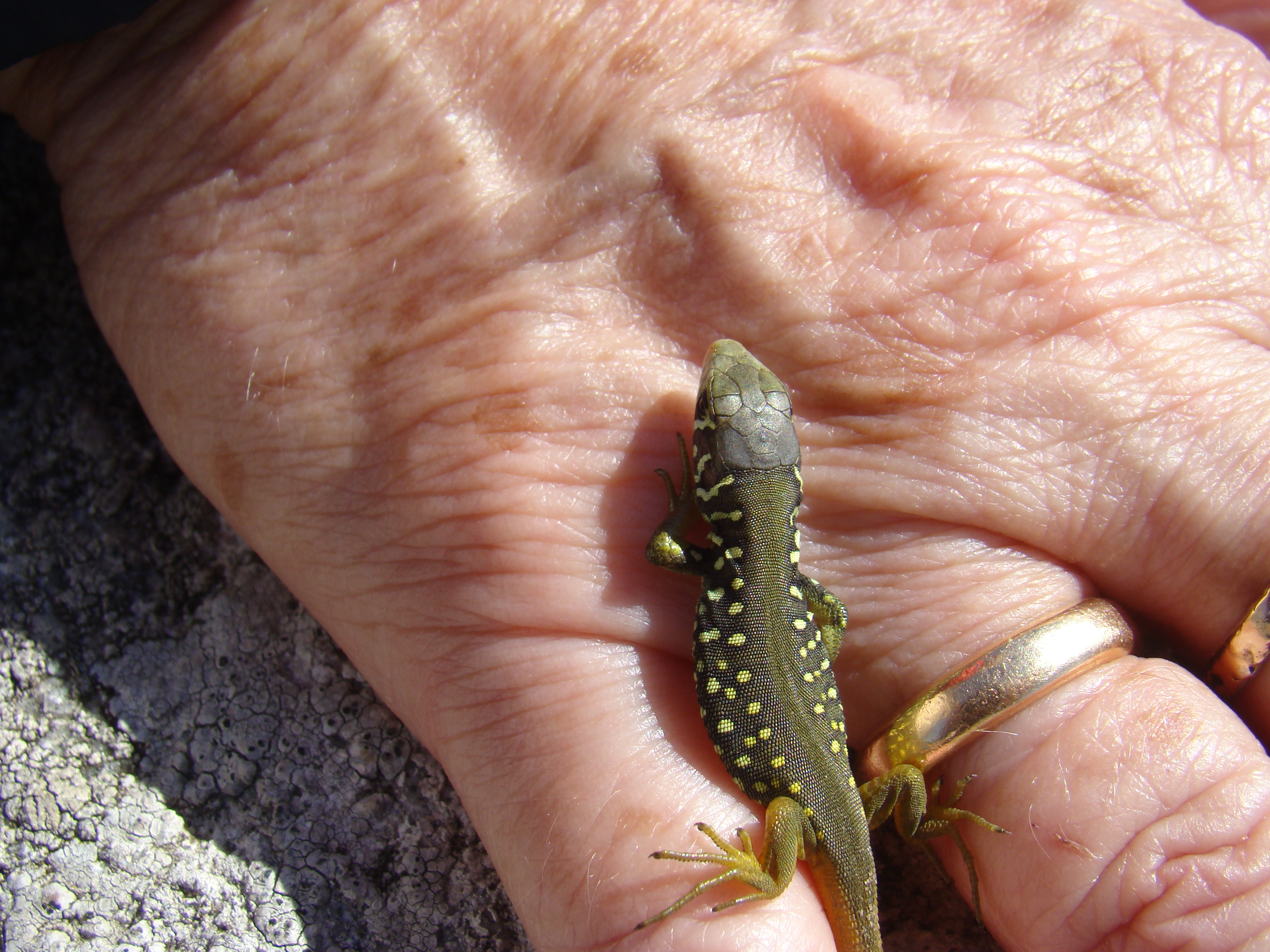
Juvenile

The natural habitats of L. schreiberi are temperate forests and shrublands, Mediterranean-type shrubby vegetation, rivers, and pastureland.

== Conservation status ==
Lacerta schreiberi is threatened by habitat loss.

== Description ==
A large species, L. schreiberi measures about 13.5 cm (5.3 in) snout-to-vent (SVL); including the tail, it measures about 38 cm (15 in).

== Diet ==
Lacerta schreiberi is mainly insectivorous, though it also preys on small lizards like the iberian wall lizard or large psammodromus.

== Reproduction ==
Lacerta schreiberi is oviparous. Clutch size varies from 11 to 28 eggs.
