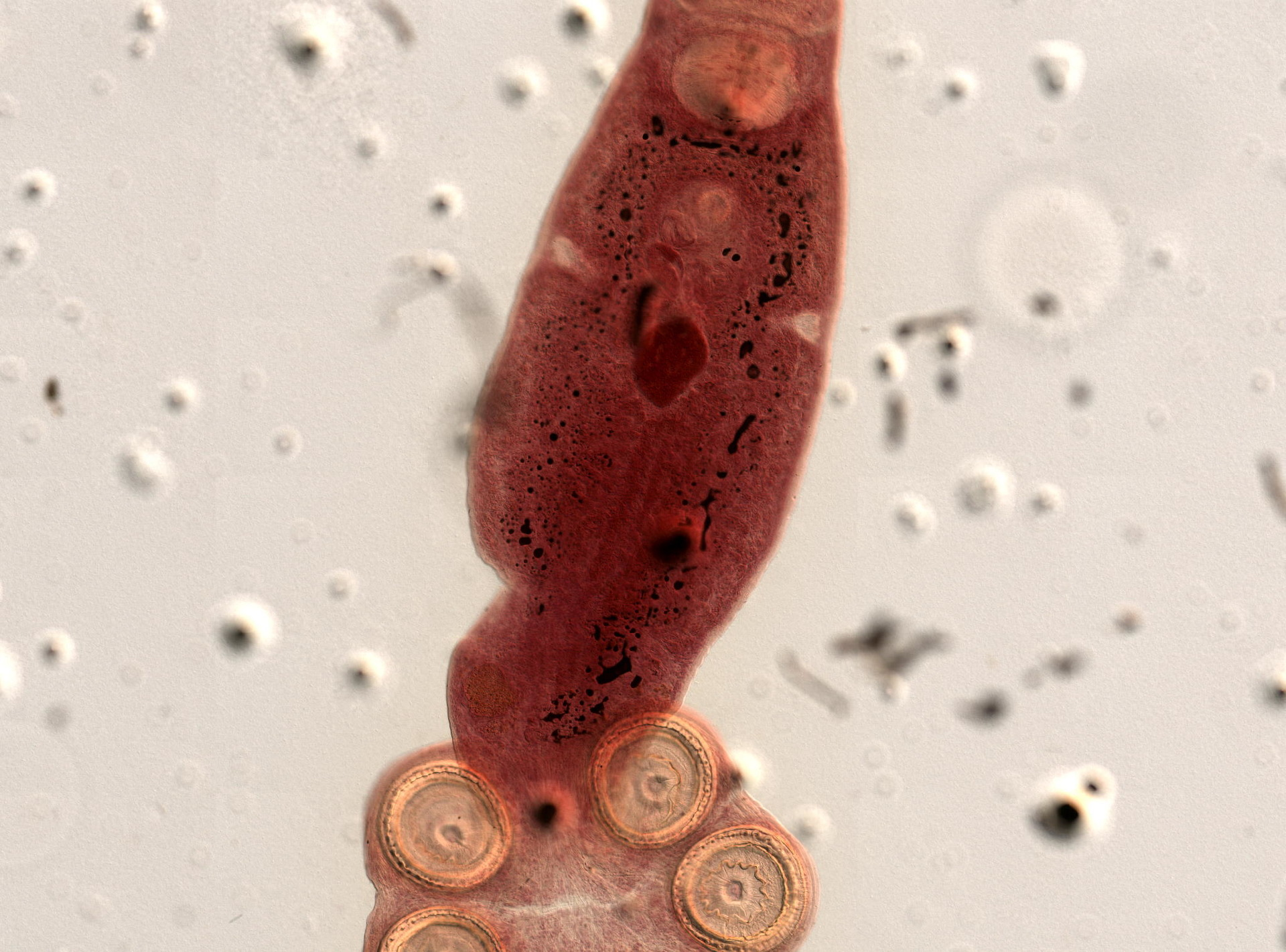
- Polystomoides megacotyle

Scientific classification
- Kingdom: Animalia
- Phylum: Platyhelminthes
- Class: Monogenea
- Order: Polystomatidea
- Family: Polystomatidae
- Genus: Polystomoides; Ward, 1917

= Polystomoides =

Genus of flatworms

Polystomoides is a genus of flatworms belonging to the family Polystomatidae.

The species of this genus are found in Australia and Northern America.

Species:

- Polystomoides australiensis Rohde & Pearson, 1980
- Polystomoides brasiliensis Vieira, Novelli, Sousa & Lima, 2008
- Polystomoides coronatus (Leidy, 1888) Ozaki, 1935
- Polystomoides fuquesi Mañe-Garzón & Gil, 1962
- Polystomoides magdalenensis Lenis & Garca-Prieto, 2009
- Polystomoides malayi Rohde, 1963
- Polystomoides megaovum Ozaki, 1936
- Polystomoides nelsoni Du Preez & Rooyen, 2015
- Polystomoides ocellatum (Rudolphi, 1819)
- Polystomoides oris
- Polystomoides rohdei Mañe-Garzón & Holcman-Spector, 1968
- Polystomoides scottae Pichelin, 1995
- Polystomoides scriptanus Héritier, Verneau, Smith, Coetzer & Du Preez, 2017
- Polystomoides soredensis Héritier, Verneau, Smith, Coetzer & Du Preez, 2017
- Polystomoides uruguayensis Mañe-Garzón & Gil, 1961
