= Egid Schreiber =

Austrian zoologist (1836–1913)

- Born: 15 January 1836; Graz, Styria, Austrian Empire
- Died: 23 November 1913; Görz, Austria-Hungary
- Known for: Herpetologia Europaea (1875)
- Scientific career
- Fields: Zoology, Herpetology
- Author abbrev. (zoology): Schreiber

Egid Schreiber (15 January 1836 – 23 November 1913) was an Austrian zoologist and schoolteacher best known for his contributions to European herpetology. He spent most of his professional life in Görz (today Gorizia, Italy), where he conducted extensive studies on amphibians and reptiles alongside a long career in secondary education.

His major work, Herpetologia Europaea (1875), provided the first comprehensive systematic treatment of European amphibians and reptiles and remains a foundational reference in herpetological literature. Several reptile species, including Acanthodactylus schreiberi, were named in his honour in recognition of his taxonomic contributions.

== Personal life and education ==
Schreiber was born on 15 January 1836 in Graz, the capital of Styria in the Austrian Empire. In 1842, he moved with his parents to Görz, then a provincial town of the Habsburg monarchy in the Adriatic region.

He completed his secondary education at the gymnasium in Görz in 1854 and subsequently enrolled at the University of Graz, where he studied natural sciences and geography. He passed the teaching qualification examination (Lehramtsprüfung) in natural history, mathematics, and physics, and earned the degree of Doctor of Philosophy (Dr. phil.) in 1860.

Schreiber died on 23 November 1913 in Görz, Austria-Hungary (now Gorizia, Italy).

== Career ==
=== Teaching ===
After completing his doctorate, Schreiber began working as a substitute teacher in Graz. He later taught briefly at the Kommunalgymnasium in Lugosch before joining the newly founded Realschule in Görz in 1861 as a teacher of natural sciences.

He became a full professor in 1867 and, after a short appointment at the Staatsgymnasium in Salzburg (1870–1874), returned to Görz as director of the Realschule, a position he held until his retirement in 1901. In addition to his directorship, he served as provincial school inspector for Italian-language elementary schools and chaired examination commissions.

=== Scientific work ===
Alongside his teaching career, Schreiber carried out extensive field research in the Alpe-Adria region, focusing on the distribution, morphology, and ecology of local amphibians and reptiles. His work emphasized direct observation and specimen-based taxonomy, reflecting the empirical traditions of 19th-century zoology.

Schreiber published regularly in the Verhandlungen der Zoologisch-Botanischen Gesellschaft in Wien, including a notable 1891 paper on Lacerta mosorensis based on material from the Karst region.

== Major works ==
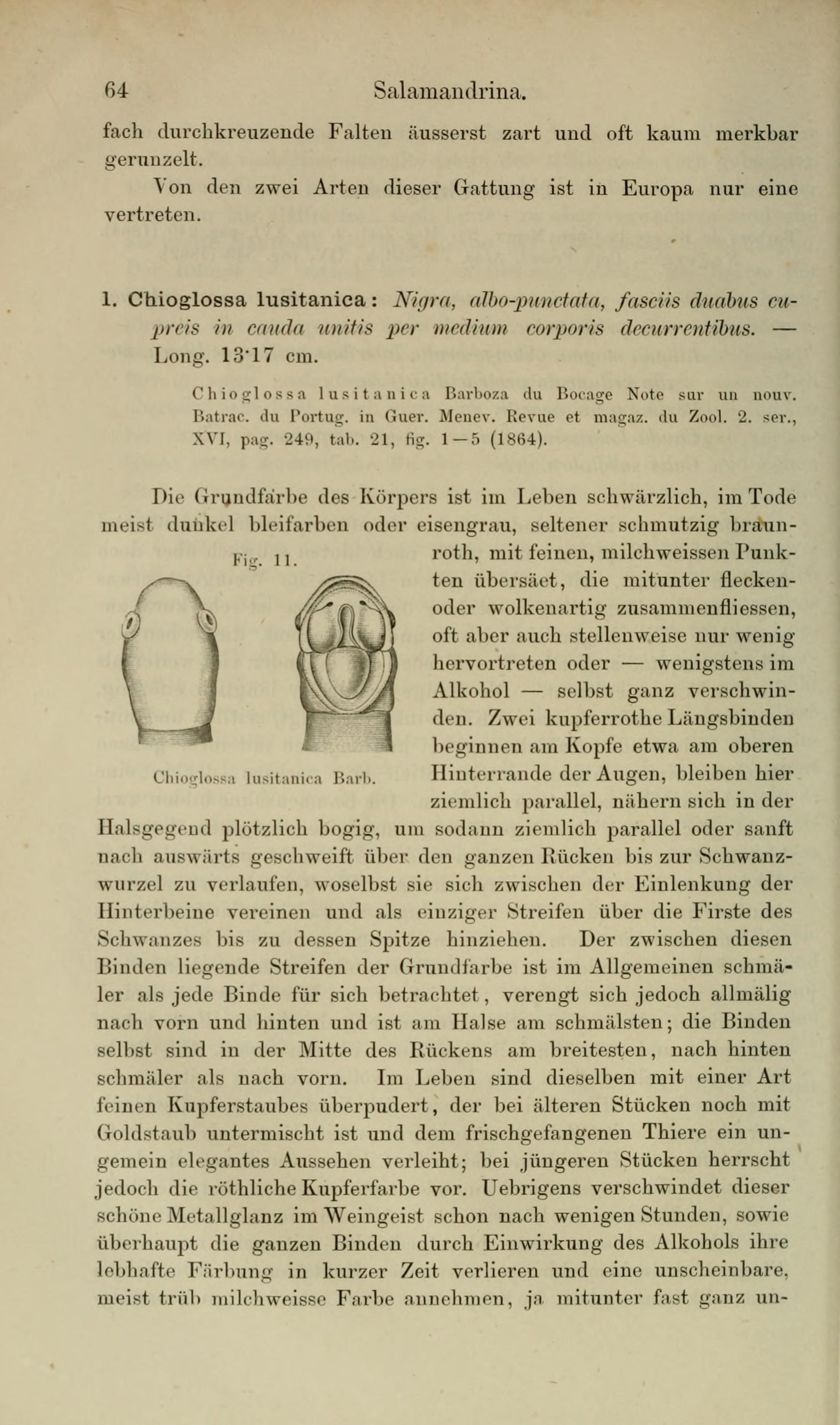
A random page from Herpetologia Europaea (p. 64)

Schreiber's most influential publication, Herpetologia Europaea (1875), is a 674-page systematic catalogue of all amphibian and reptile species known from Europe at the time. The work synthesised field observations, museum specimens, and earlier literature into a unified taxonomic framework, providing identification keys, distributional data, and morphological descriptions.

A revised second edition was published in 1912, followed by a supplementary volume in 1913, incorporating new locality records and taxonomic revisions based on accumulated material.

== Legacy ==
Several reptile taxa were named in Schreiber's honour. The best known is Acanthodactylus schreiberi (Boulenger, 1878), commonly known as Schreiber's fringe-fingered lizard, a species endemic to Cyprus. Another is Lacerta schreiberi Bedriaga, 1878, the Iberian emerald lizard, native to the Iberian Peninsula and southern France.

Although many of his morphology-based classifications have since been revised using molecular data, Schreiber's detailed locality records and emphasis on empirical observation continue to be cited in modern herpetological research and historical biogeography.
