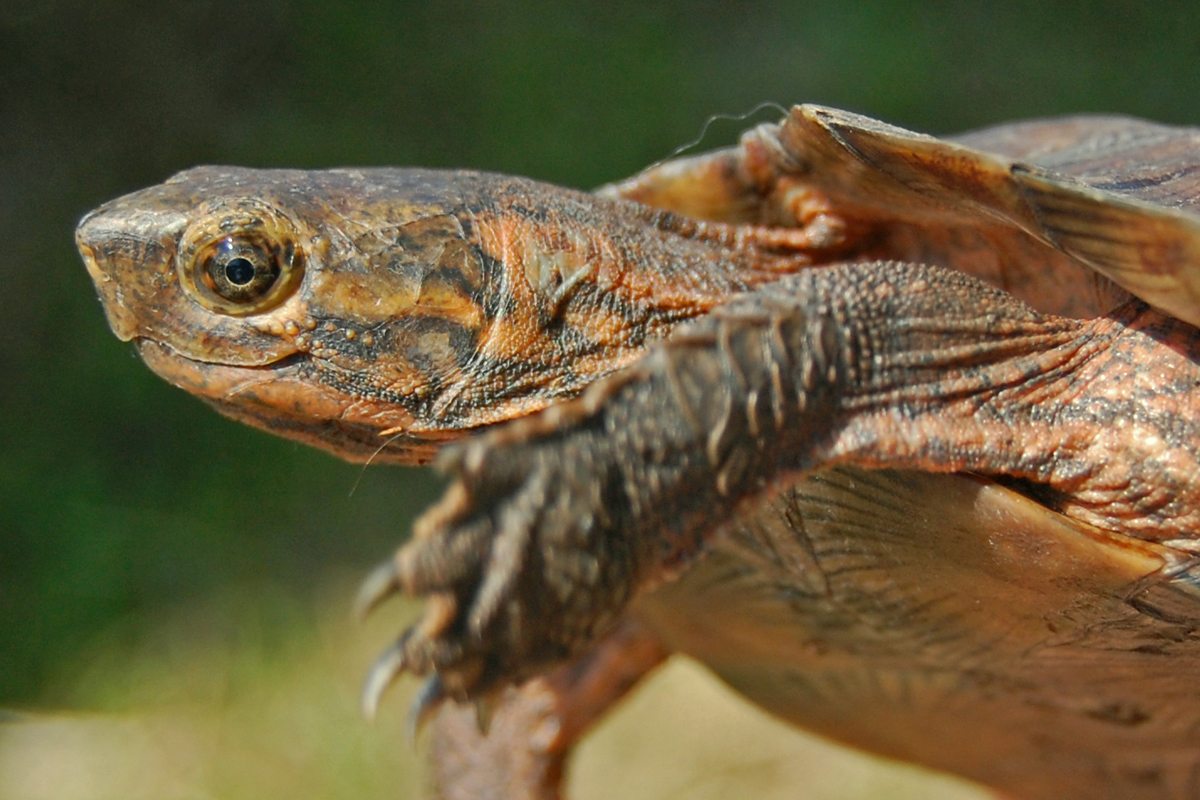
- A young Cyclemys dentata from Java, Indonesia.

Scientific classification
- Kingdom: Animalia
- Phylum: Chordata
- Class: Reptilia
- Order: Testudines
- Suborder: Cryptodira
- Family: Geoemydidae
- Subfamily: Geoemydinae
- Genus: Cyclemys; Bell, 1834

Type species
- Cyclemys orbiculata Bell, 1834

Species
- 7 sp., see text
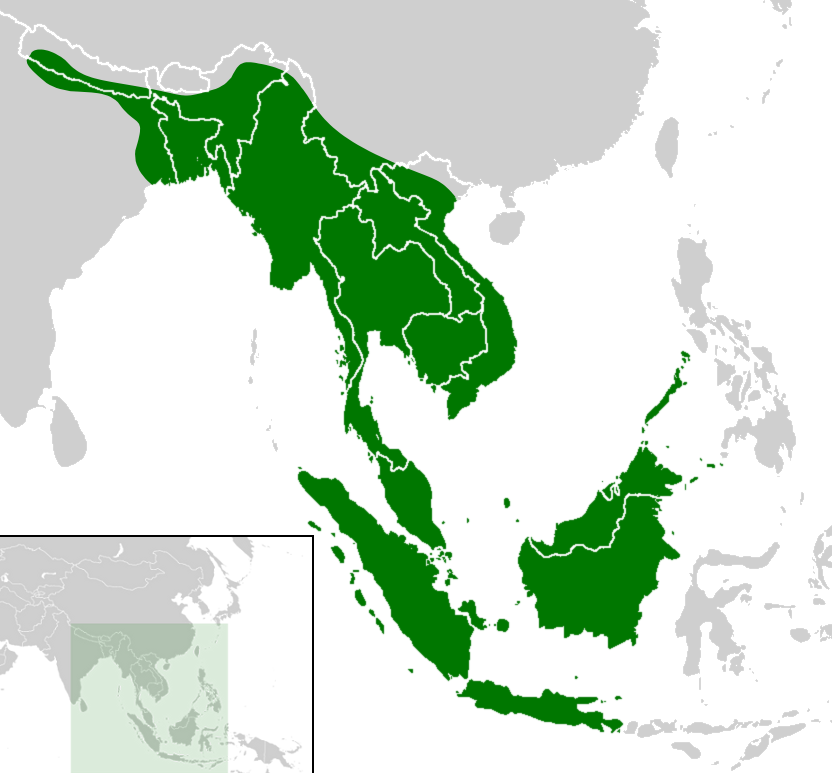
- Distribution of Cyclemys: The exact range of individual species is uncertain.

= Cyclemys =

Asian leaf turtles

Genus of turtles

Cyclemys is a genus of freshwater turtles, commonly referred to as Asian leaf turtles, from the family Geoemydidae. The genus occurs throughout Southeast and South Asia, and currently contains seven species.

Asian leaf turtles average 25 cm (9.8 in) in length. They are mostly brown to greenish in color, with round to rectangular shells. Their carapaces bear a superficial resemblance to plant leaves, hence their common name. They can be found around shallow, slow-moving bodies of water in hilly forests. Adults are primarily terrestrial, though juveniles are more aquatic.

== Taxonomy and nomenclature ==
Cyclemys turtles belong to the family Geoemydidae under the subfamily Geoemydinae. They were first described in 1834 by English zoologist Thomas Bell in his work A Monograph of the Testudinata. Cyclemys and closely related genera (Cuora, Pyxidea, and Notochelys) are believed to have diverged from a common Heosemys-like ancestor.

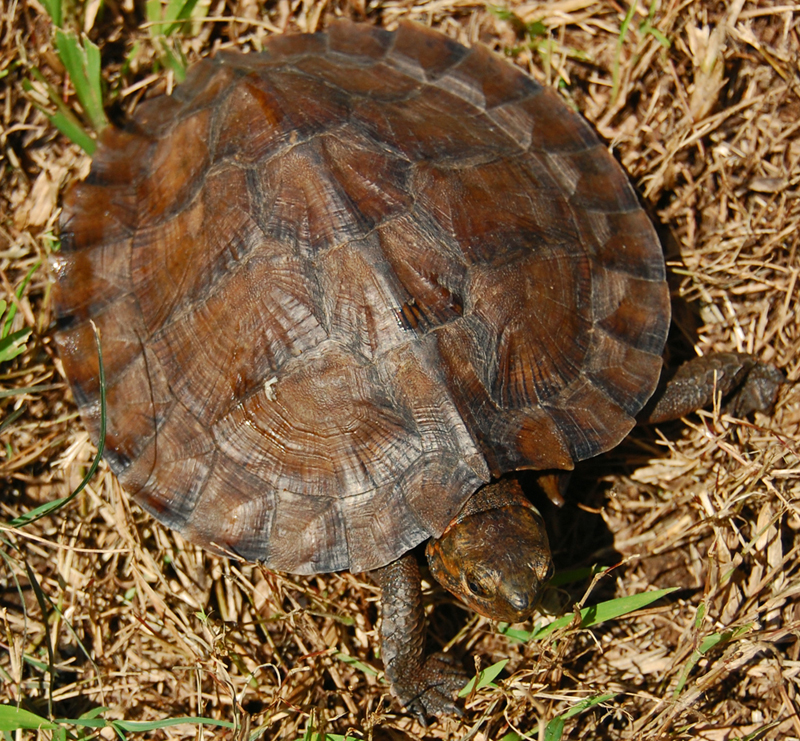
The characteristic round carapace of the genus, shown here by an adult Cyclemys dentata

Cyclemys taxonomy and phylogeny have been historically difficult to ascertain due to the morphological similarity between species, as well as changes in the color patterns during growth. Until recently, the genus was thought to comprise only one or two morphologically variable species, C. dentata and C. oldhamii. Subsequent investigation has now put the number of species under the genus to seven, though this remains controversial. The status of C. enigmatica as a valid species is contested, as is the recognition of C. atripons and C. pulchristiata, both of which are nearly impossible to tell apart morphologically.

Previously recognized species, C. tcheponensis ( = C. tiannanensis) and C. shanensis, have been merged into C. oldhamii following mtDNA sequencing. The conclusions of which showed that the morphological differences between them (the presence or absence of neck/head stripes, and hatchling color patterns) were not enough to classify them as separate species. C. ovata has been similarly subsumed into C. dentata.

The two distinct morphological differences between Cyclemys species are based on the main color of their plastrons - species with yellow bellies (C. atripons, C. dentata, and C. pulchristiata), and species with dark bellies (C. enigmatica, C. fusca, C. gemeli, and C. oldhamii).

Synonyms of Cyclemys (ex errore) include: Cyclemus Li, Cyclemis Good, and Cyclemy Mao.

The generic name Cyclemys comes from the Greek κύκλος (kyklos, meaning 'round' or 'circle', referring to the shape of the carapace) and εμύς (emys; 'freshwater turtle'). They are known under the common name Asian leaf turtles or simply leaf turtles, again because of the appearance of their carapaces. They share the collective name 'leaf turtles' with turtles of the genus Geoemyda, as well as turtles with 'leaf' in their names, such as the Annam leaf turtle (Mauremys annamensis), among others. 'Asian leaf turtle' is also the specific common name of C. dentata.

== Description ==
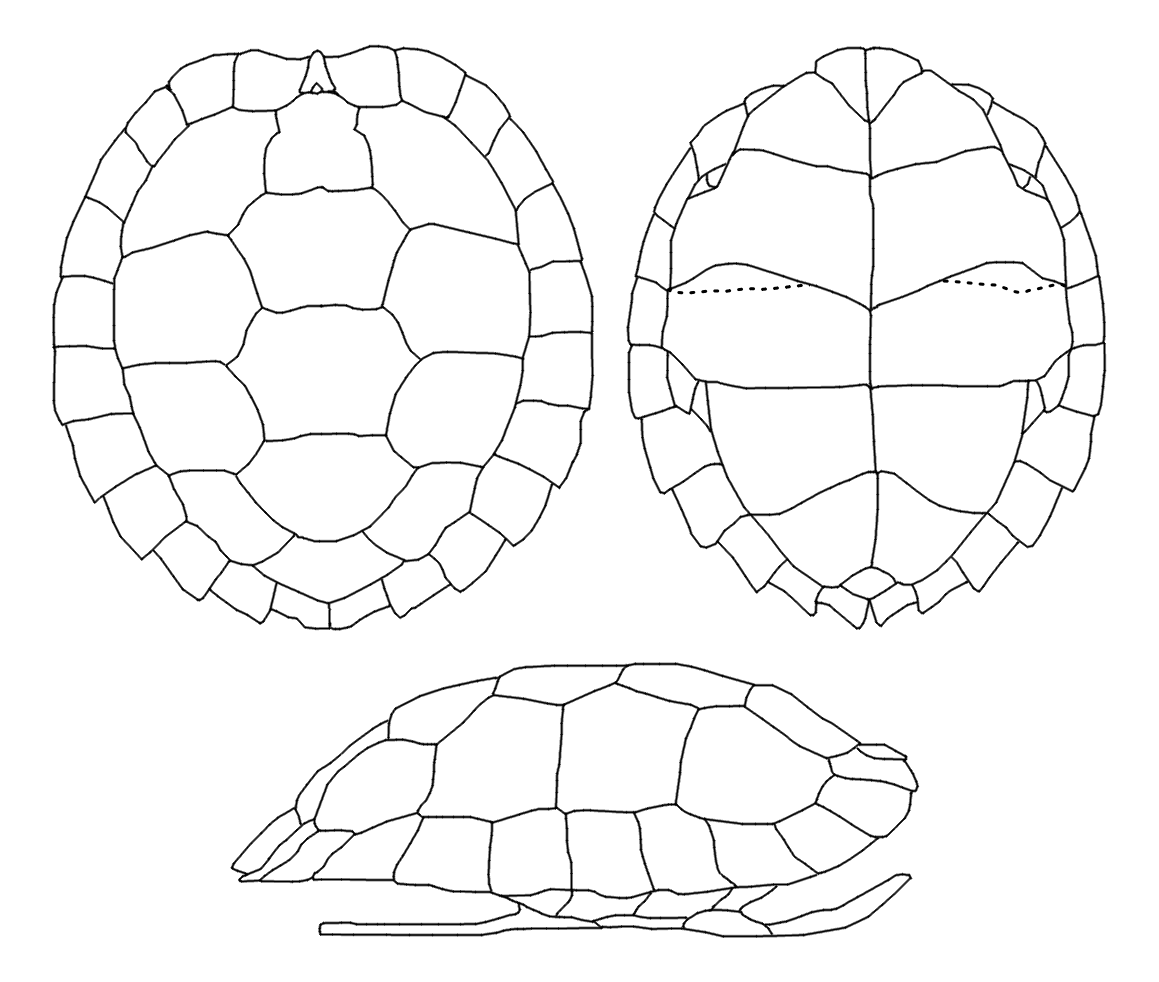
The pattern of scutes on the carapace (upper left) and plastron (upper right) of the shell of Cyclemys: Shown in broken lines are the secondary divisions of the abdominal scutes, a distinguishing characteristic of the genus which only occurs in adults.

Cyclemys turtles are characterized by more or less round carapaces, which are typically dark green, brownish, tan, or olive in color. The shell may have a prominent vertebral keel running from head to tail. Serrated marginal scutes are common in juveniles. In adults, only the posterior marginal scutes are serrated.

Adults of Cyclemys also develop a joint in the middle of their plastrons (known as a plastral hinge), enabling them to articulate the front and rear halves to some extent. Unlike the closely related Cuora, which can completely close its shell because of the hinge, Cyclemys plastral hinges only close the shell partially. The plastral hinge may also play a significant role in facilitating egg-laying in adult females.

A distinguishing characteristic of the genus is the secondary division of the abdominal scutes (the middle pair of scutes in the plastron) due to the development of the plastral hinge as the turtle matures. It eventually leads to the formation of small triangular additional scutes between the abdominal and pectoral scutes.

Cyclemys turtles are cryptodires, having the ability to pull their heads straight back and vertically into their shells instead of folding them sideways like pleurodires. The head varies between species from dull to striped with bright red or orange bands of color. The plastron can have a dark or light (tan to yellow) background which can be uniform or patterned with fine lines radiating from the center of each plastral scute.

Their feet are partially webbed and well developed for either aquatic or terrestrial mobility. They can grow to about 25 cm (9.8 in) in length.

Cyclemys species achieve sexual maturity after seven to 12 years, earlier for males and later for females. Sexual dimorphism is apparently mostly absent, though females are likely to outgrow males. Females usually deposit 10 to 15 eggs per clutch.

=== Lifespan ===
A C. dentata individual has been recorded living up to 14.7 years in captivity. However, an adult specimen caught in the wild has also been recorded living another 14 years, making it likely that the maximum lifespan of Cyclemys species has been underestimated.

== Distribution and habitat ==
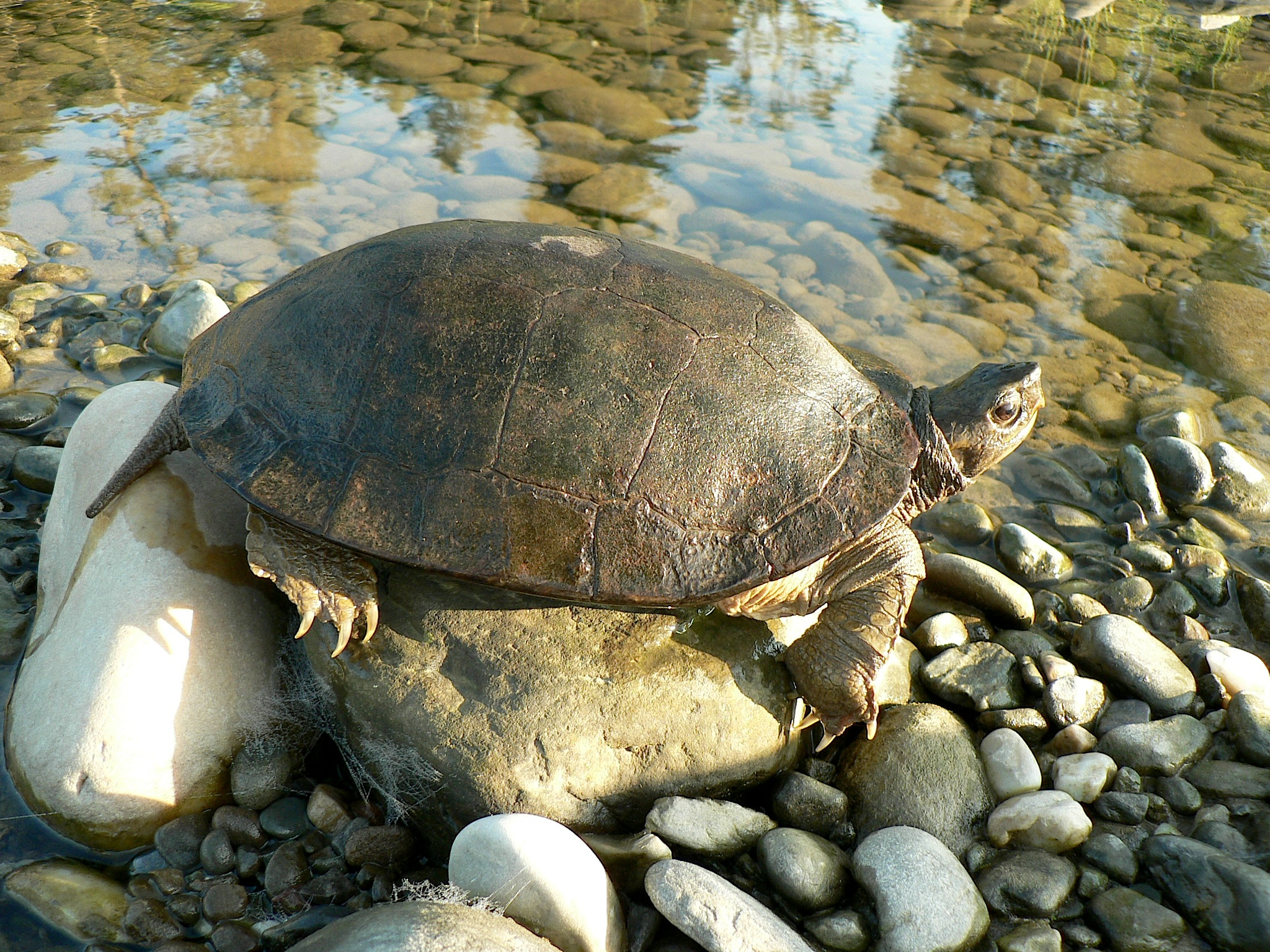
A Cyclemys turtle along a perennial stream (Upper Dikorai) in Pakke Tiger Reserve

The distribution ranges of individual species of Cyclemys remain unclear, but the genus occurs in South Asia and Indochina (Vietnam, Myanmar, Laos, Cambodia, Myanmar, Thailand, central to southern China, Bangladesh, Nepal, and northeastern India), as well as the Southeast Asian countries of Malaysia, Indonesia, Brunei, and the Philippines.

Adults spend most of their time on land. They can be found near ponds, streams, and other shallow, slow-moving bodies of water in hilly forests. Although more common in lower elevations, they have been found in higher elevations exceeding 1,000 m (3,300 ft) above sea level.

They are omnivorous, but juveniles tend to be more carnivorous. Because their prey are typically aquatic, the younger turtles are found in water more often than adults.

== Species ==
The species are listed alphabetically along with common names, identifying adult characteristics, and known geographical distribution. They are divided into two morphologically distinct groups, although molecular phylogenetics have shown that these do not correspond to clades. Instead, C. gemeli and C. fusca form a sister group with respect to the other species.

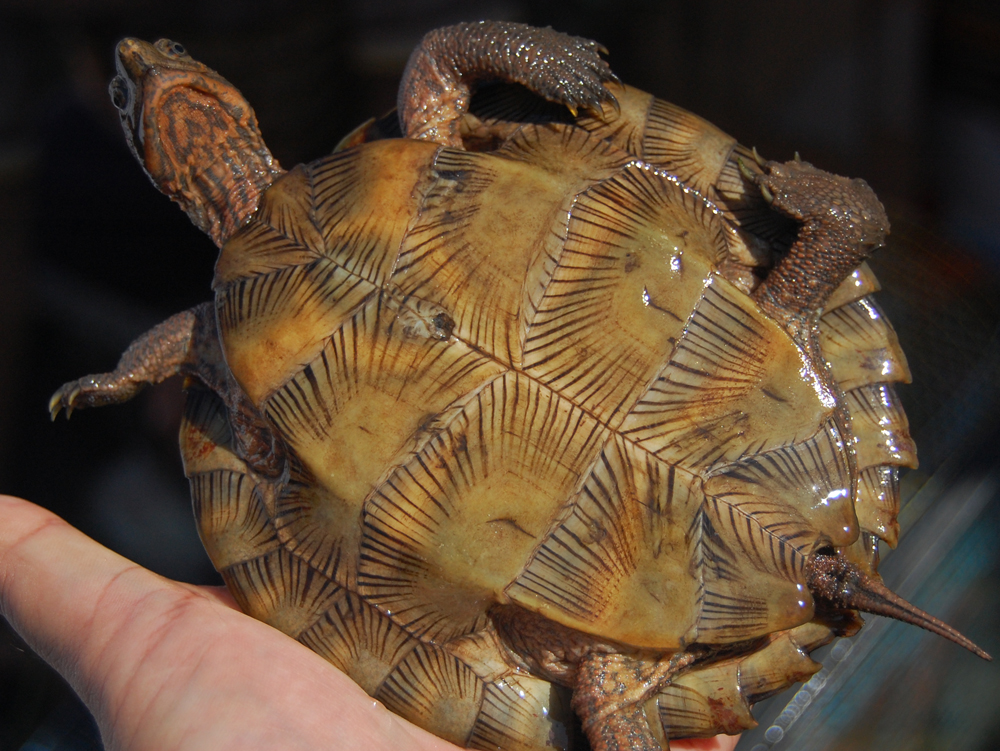
The yellow plastron of a juvenile Cyclemys dentata.

=== Yellow-bellied species ===
- Cyclemys atripons (Iverson & McCold, 1997) – western black-bridged leaf turtle or striped leaf turtle
- Cyclemys dentata (Gray, 1831) – Asian leaf turtle or brown stream terrapin
- Cyclemys pulchristiata (Fritz, Gaulke, and Lehr 1997) – eastern black-bridged leaf turtle

=== Dark-bellied species ===
- Cyclemys enigmatica Fritz, Guicking, Auer, Sommer, Wink & Hundsdörfer, 2008 – enigmatic leaf turtle
- Cyclemys fusca Fritz, Guicking, Auer, Sommer, Wink & Hundsdörfer, 2008 – Myanmar brown leaf turtle
- Cyclemys gemeli Fritz, Guicking, Auer, Sommer, Wink & Hundsdörfer, 2008 – Assam leaf turtle
- Cyclemys oldhamii Gray, 1863 – Oldham's leaf turtle, Southeast Asian leaf turtle

Several species previously classified under Cyclemys – C. amboinensis, C. flavomarginata, C. mouhotti, and C. trifasciata – are now classified under the genus Cuora. C. annandalii is now classified under Heosemys, C. annamensis under Mauremys, and C. giebelii as Notochelys platynota.

== Conservation ==
Cyclemys species are often caught and sold for the pet trade, food, or traditional medicine. On August 25, 1998, Forest Protection authorities of Vietnam confiscated a shipment of about 700 turtles with an estimated 30 individuals of C. oldhamii. In May 2007, more than 3000 individuals of Cyclemys, along with Asian box turtles, were confiscated in hundreds of crates in Yangjiang, China.

The most commonly encountered species of Cyclemys in the pet trade, C. dentata, is now being captive bred. They are usually preferred, as they are healthier, more acclimated to handling, and captive breeding minimizes the impact on wild populations.

The confusion over their exact taxonomy and distribution led to an incomplete assessment of their conservation status by the IUCN. In 1991, with only two species recognized, Cyclemys was given the Action Plan Rating of 3 - in need of some conservation action. In the last assessment in 2000 by the Asian Turtle Trade Working Group of IUCN, the different species currently recognized under the genus Cyclemys were treated as all belonging to the species C. dentata. This resulted in the current incorrect classification of all of the species as lower risk/near threatened. Until now, the true conservation status, the actual effects of wildlife trade, deforestation, and habitat loss on individual Cyclemys species, have yet to be studied.

== See also ==
- Cuora, Asian box turtles
- Geoemydidae
- Geoemyda
- Mauremys, pond turtles
- Turtle
