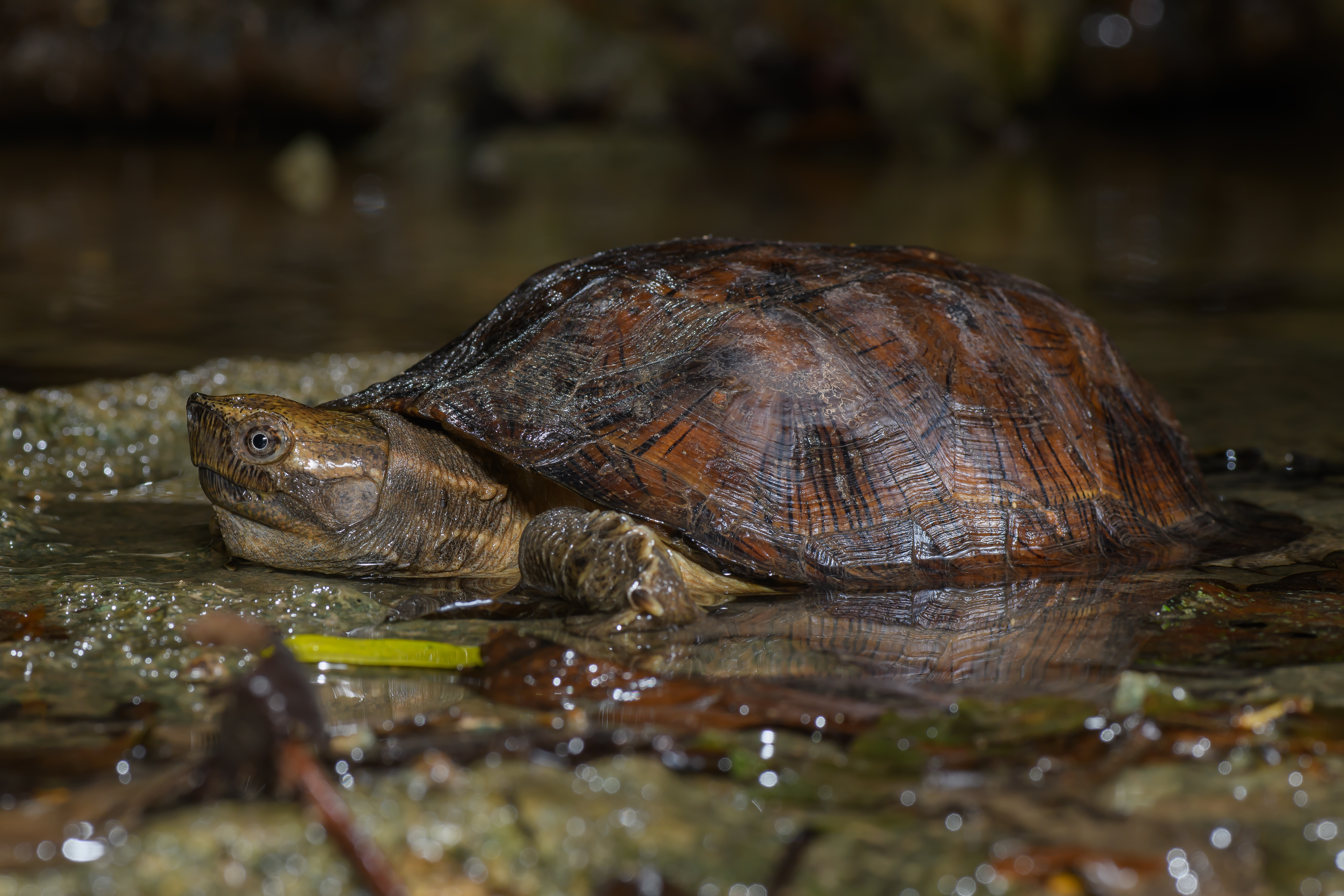
- Cyclemys oldhamii from Thailand

Conservation status
- Endangered (IUCN 3.1)
- CITES Appendix II

Scientific classification
- Kingdom: Animalia
- Phylum: Chordata
- Class: Reptilia
- Order: Testudines
- Suborder: Cryptodira
- Family: Geoemydidae
- Genus: Cyclemys
- Species: C. oldhamii

Binomial name
- Cyclemys oldhamii Gray, 1863

Synonyms
- Cyclemys oldhamii Gray, 1863; Cyclemys oldhami [sic] — Günther, 1864 (ex errore); Cyclemys dhor shanensis Annandale, 1918; Geomyda tcheponensis Bourret, 1939; Cyclemys tiannanensis Kou, 1989

= Oldham's leaf turtle =

Cyclemys oldhamii

Species of turtle

Oldham's leaf turtle (Cyclemys oldhamii) is a species of turtle in the family Geoemydidae. The species is native to southeast Asia. As many as three subspecies are sometimes recognized as being valid.

== Etymology ==
Both the specific name, oldhamii, and the common name, Oldham's leaf turtle, are in honor of Thomas Oldham, Superintendent of the Geological Survey of India. The generic name Cyclemys comes from the Greek κύκλος (kyklos, meaning "round" or "circle", referring to the shape of the carapace) and εμύς (emys, meaning "freshwater turtle").

== Geographic distribution ==
Cyclemys oldhamii is found in Bangladesh, in the terai of mizoram, in Myanmar, Thailand, Vietnam, West Borneo, Sumatra and Java. In addition, Cyclemys oldhamii shanensis – sometimes considered a distinct species due to its shell pattern, oft described as looking similar to aged meat – occurs from central Myanmar to Thailand and Cambodia. The type locality was originally given as "Mergui and Siam", and restricted to Mergui by Smith (1931).

== Gallery ==
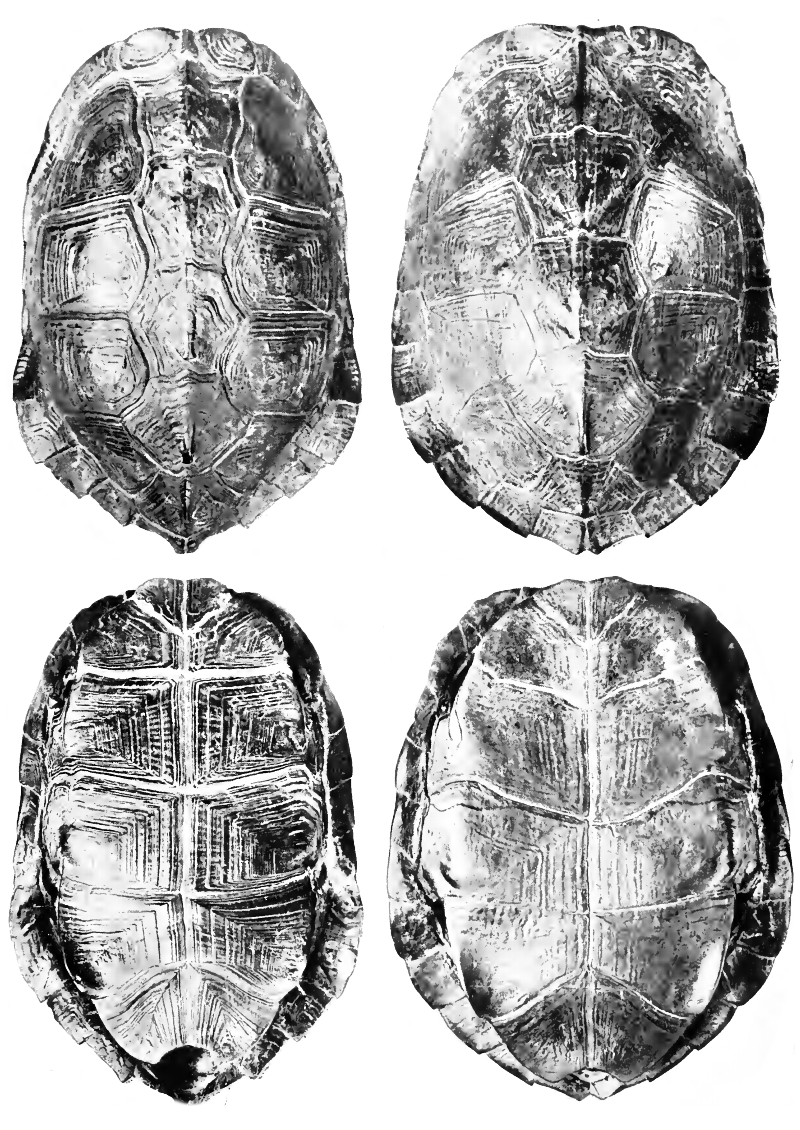
Cyclemys oldhamii carapace and plastron.

== Hybrid ==
In Germany, a case of hybridization between a male Cyclemys shanensis and a female Chinese stripe-necked turtle (Mauremys sinensis) has been described.

== See also ==
- Cyclemys
