= Myanmar brown leaf turtle =

Conservation status
- Least Concern (IUCN 3.1)
- CITES Appendix II

Scientific classification
- Kingdom: Animalia
- Phylum: Chordata
- Class: Reptilia
- Order: Testudines
- Suborder: Cryptodira
- Family: Geoemydidae
- Genus: Cyclemys
- Species: C. fusca

Binomial name
- Cyclemys fusca Fritz, Guicking, Auer, Sommer, Wink & Hundsdörfer, 2008
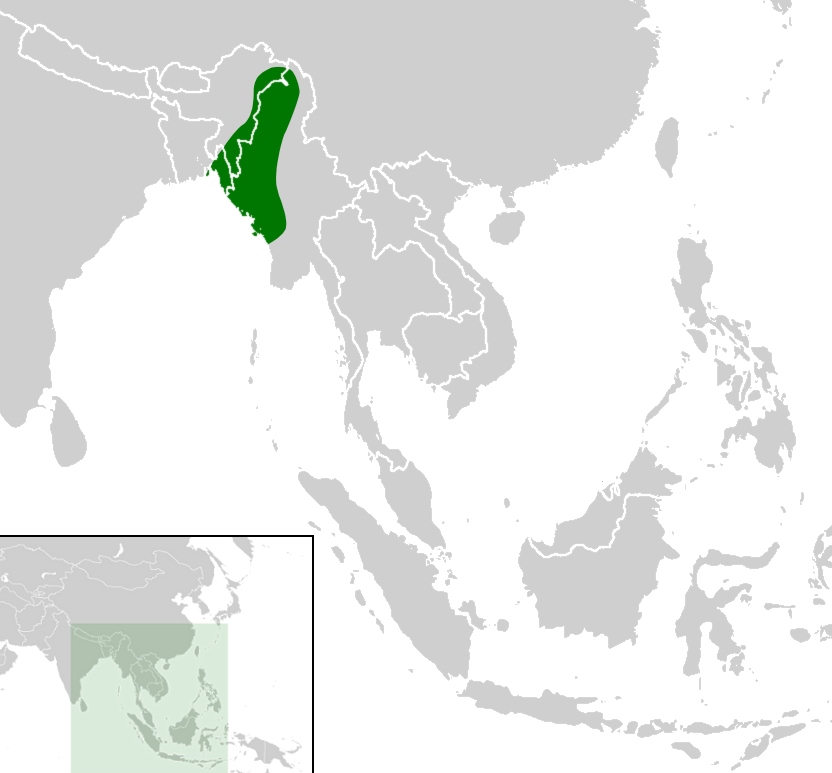
- Cyclemys fusca range map

Species of turtle

The Myanmar brown leaf turtle (Cyclemys fusca) is a species of Asian leaf turtle found in Myanmar.

== Description ==
Its carapace is dark brown, ovoid, and lacks patterns in adults. The plastron is dark brown to black with or without dense, black, radiating lines. The head is greenish yellow. The throat and neck are uniformly dark. The bridge is dark brown to black.

== Distribution ==
Myanmar brown leaf turtle is widespread in Myanmar, and perhaps occurs in adjacent India and Bangladesh.

== See also ==
- Cyclemys
