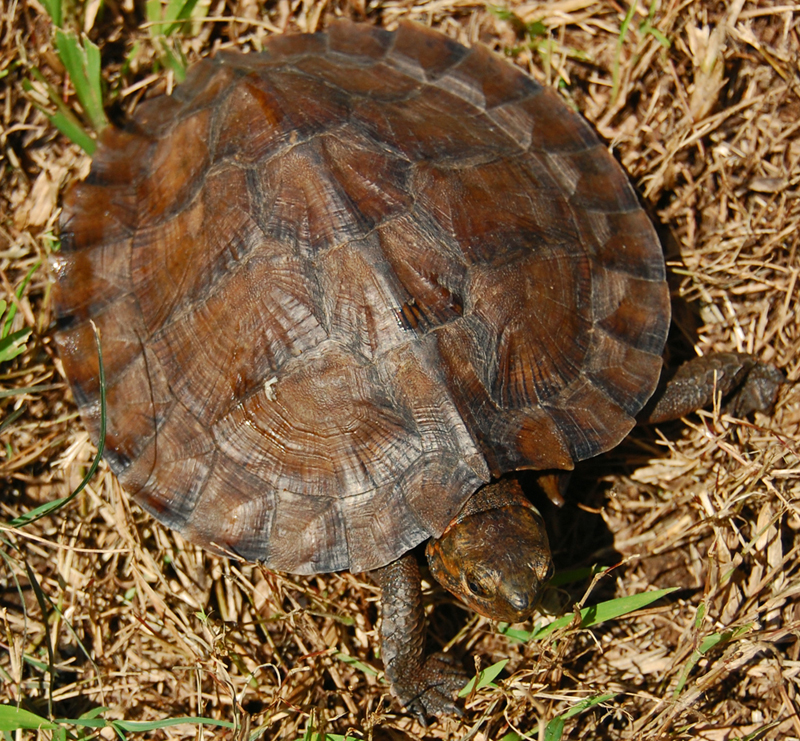

Conservation status
- Near Threatened (IUCN 3.1)
- CITES Appendix II

Scientific classification
- Kingdom: Animalia
- Phylum: Chordata
- Class: Reptilia
- Order: Testudines
- Suborder: Cryptodira
- Family: Geoemydidae
- Genus: Cyclemys
- Species: C. dentata

Binomial name
- Cyclemys dentata (Gray, 1831)

Synonyms
- Emys hasseltii Boie, 1826 (nomen nudum); Emys dhor Gray, 1831; Emys hasselti Boie, 1831 (ex errore); Cyclemys orbiculata Bell, 1834; Cistudo diardii Duméril & Bibron, 1835; Clemmys (Clemmys) hasseltii Boie, 1835; Cistudo (Cyclemys) dentata Gray, 1844; Emys diardii Schlegel, 1849; Cyclemys dentata Gray, 1856; Cyclemys bellii Gray, 1863; Cyclemys ovata Gray, 1863; Cistudo orbiculata Giebel, 1866; Cyclemys dhor Gray, 1870; Cistudo diardi Smith, 1931 (ex errore); Cyclemys belli Smith, 1931 (ex errore); Cyclemis dentata Goode, 1967; Cyclemys ovala Taylor, 1970 (ex errore); Cyclemys dentata dentata Bonin, Devaux & Dupré, 1996; Cyclemys dentate Zhou, 2006 (ex errore)

= Asian leaf turtle =

Species of turtle

The Asian leaf turtle (Cyclemys dentata) is a species of turtle found in Southeast Asia. They are quite common in the pet trade; their carapaces resemble that of a Cuora amboinensis hybrid.

== Feeding ==
This species is omnivorous and feeds on vegetation and fruits, as well as mollusks, crustaceans, and fish. It is also known to be a scavenger and very often seen to take carrion.

== Behavior ==
The Asian leaf turtle is quite elusive and sighting is uncommon. It is not strong swimmer preferring instead to walk on the bottom of a body of water rather than swimming freely. According to Das, the adult spends its nights on land and moves to water during the day. It will squirt its digestive system contents when it feels threatened.

== Size ==
Asian leaf turtles can grow 6 to 9.5 inches (15 to 24 cm) long and 4.5 to 6.5 inches in width.

== Distribution ==
The turtle can be found in North India, North-east India (Manipur), Bangladesh, Myanmar (Burma), Thailand, Cambodia, Vietnam, West Malaysia, Indonesia (Sumatra, Java, Borneo, Bali), Philippines (Palawan: Calamian Islands etc.), and China.

This species is found up to 1,200 m of elevation, but the depth range is unknown.
