= Wood turtle (disambiguation) =

The wood turtle (Glyptemys insculpta) is a species of turtle endemic to North America.

Wood turtle may also refer to:

- Neotropical wood turtles (genus Rhinoclemmys) including:
  - Brown wood turtle, Rhinoclemmys annulata, a turtle found in Colombia, Costa Rica, Ecuador, Honduras, Nicaragua and Panama
  - Furrowed wood turtle, Rhinoclemmys areolata
  - Maracaibo wood turtle, Rhinoclemmys diademata
  - Black wood turtle, Rhinoclemmys funerea, a species of turtle found in Costa Rica, Honduras, Nicaragua and Panama
  - Colombian wood turtle, Rhinoclemmys melanosterna
  - Large-nosed wood turtle, Rhinoclemmys nasuta, a turtle found in Colombia and Ecuador
  - Painted wood turtle, Rhinoclemmys pulcherrima
  - Spot-legged wood turtle, Rhinoclemmys punctularia
  - Mexican spotted wood turtle, Rhinoclemmys rubida, a turtle endemic to Mexico
