= List of reptiles of Colombia =

Colombia is the sixth richest country in the world for reptiles, and third richest in the Western Hemisphere.

== Turtles ==
The turtles (order: Chelonii or Testudines) number thirty-three species from nine families. Fifteen species are listed as vulnerable, endangered, or critically endangered. Three turtle species are listed as endemic.

Snapping turtles - Chelydridae
| Scientific name | Common name | Distribution | Status |
| Chelydra acutirostris | South American snapping turtle | Pacific & Caribbean lowlands | |
Sea turtles - Cheloniidae
| Scientific name | Common name | Distribution | Status |
| Caretta caretta | Loggerhead sea turtle | Caribbean | endangered |
| Lepidochelys kempii | Kemp's ridley sea turtle | Caribbean | critically endangered |
| Lepidochelys olivacea | Olive ridley sea turtle | Pacific & Caribbean coasts | vulnerable |
| Chelonia mydas | Green sea turtle | Pacific & Caribbean coasts | endangered |
| Eretmochelys imbricata | Hawksbill sea turtle | Pacific & Caribbean coasts | critically endangered |
Sea turtles - Dermochelyidae
| Scientific name | Common name | Distribution | Status |
| Dermochelys coriacea | Leatherback sea turtle | Pacific & Caribbean coasts | critically endangered |
Mud turtles - Kinosternidae
| Scientific name | Common name | Distribution | Status |
| Kinosternon dunni | Colombian mud turtle | Pacific lowlands (Chocó) | Endemic; vulnerable |
| Kinosternon leucostomum | White-lipped mud turtle | Pacific lowlands | vulnerable |
| Kinosternon scorpioides | Scorpion mud turtle | Pacific lowlands, Amazon basin | |
Pond turtles - Emydidae
| Scientific name | Common name | Distribution | Status |
| Trachemys callirostris | Colombian slider | | |
| Trachemys venusta | Meso-American slider | | |
Wood turtles - Geoemydidae
| Scientific name | Common name | Distribution | Status |
| Rhinoclemmys annulata | Brown wood turtle | | |
| Rhinoclemmys diademata | Maracaibo wood turtle | | |
| Rhinoclemmys melanosterna | Colombian wood turtle | | |
| Rhinoclemmys nasuta | Large-nosed wood turtle | | |
Tortoises - Testudinidae
| Scientific name | Common name | Distribution | Status |
| Chelonoidis carbonaria | Red-footed tortoise | Amazon basin | vulnerable |
| Chelonoidis denticulata | Yellow-footed tortoise | Amazon basin | vulnerable |
Side-necked turtles - Podocnemididae
| Scientific name | Common name | Distribution | Status |
| Peltocephalus dumerilianus | Big-headed Amazon River turtle | Amazon basin | vulnerable |
| Podocnemis erythrocephala | Red-headed Amazon River turtle | Amazon basin | vulnerable |
| Podocnemis expansa | Giant South American turtle | Amazon basin | |
| Podocnemis lewyana | Magdalena River turtle | Magdalena River | Endemic; endangered |
| Podocnemis sextuberculata | Six-tubercled Amazon River turtle | Amazon basin | vulnerable |
| Podocnemis unifilis | Yellow-spotted Amazon River turtle | Amazon basin | vulnerable |
| Podocnemis vogli | Savanna side-necked turtle | Orinoco basin | |
Side-necked turtles - Chelidae
| Scientific name | Common name | Distribution | Status |
| Chelus fimbriata | Mata mata | Amazon & Orinoco basins | |
| Mesoclemmys dahli | Dahl's toad-headed turtle | Northeast Colombia (Bolivar) | Endemic |
| Mesoclemmys gibba | Gibba turtle | | |
| Mesoclemmys raniceps | Amazon toad-headed turtle | Amazon basin | |
| Phrynops geoffroanus | Geoffroy's side-necked turtle | Amazon basin | |
| Phrynops tuberosus | Cotinga River toad-headed turtle | Amazon basin | |
| Platemys platycephala | Twist-necked turtle | Amazon & Orinoco basins | |
| Rhinemys rufipes | Red side-necked turtle | Amazon basin | |

== Crocodilia ==
Alligators & caimans - Alligatoridae
| Scientific name | Common name | Distribution | Status |
| Paleosuchus palpebrosus | Cuvier's dwarf caiman | | |
| Paleosuchus trigonatus | Smooth-fronted caiman | | |
| Caiman crocodilus | Spectacled caiman | | |
| Melanosuchus niger | Black caiman | | |
Crocodiles - Crocodylidae
| Scientific name | Common name | Distribution | Status |
| Crocodylus acutus | American crocodile | | vulnerable |
| Crocodylus intermedius | Orinoco crocodile | | critically endangered |

== See also ==
- Fauna of Colombia
