= Rhinoclemmys panamaensis =

Rhinoclemmys panamaensis Temporal range: Early-Mid Miocene (Hemingfordian) 19–16 Ma

Scientific classification
- Kingdom: Animalia
- Phylum: Chordata
- Class: Reptilia
- Order: Testudines
- Suborder: Cryptodira
- Family: Geoemydidae
- Genus: Rhinoclemmys
- Species: R. panamaensis

Binomial name
- Rhinoclemmys panamaensis Cadena et al. 2012

Extinct species of turtle

Rhinoclemmys panamaensis is an extinct species of turtle belonging to the genus Rhinoclemmys of the family Geoemydidae known from the early to middle Miocene (Hemingfordian) Cucaracha Formation of the Panama Basin of central Panama.

== Paleoecology ==
In 2010, the holotype specimen was recovered from the Cucaracha Formation located at the western side of the Centenario Bridge in the Panama Canal Zone. The same formation has provided fossils of the crocodylian Centenariosuchus, and the artiodactyl Paratoceras.
