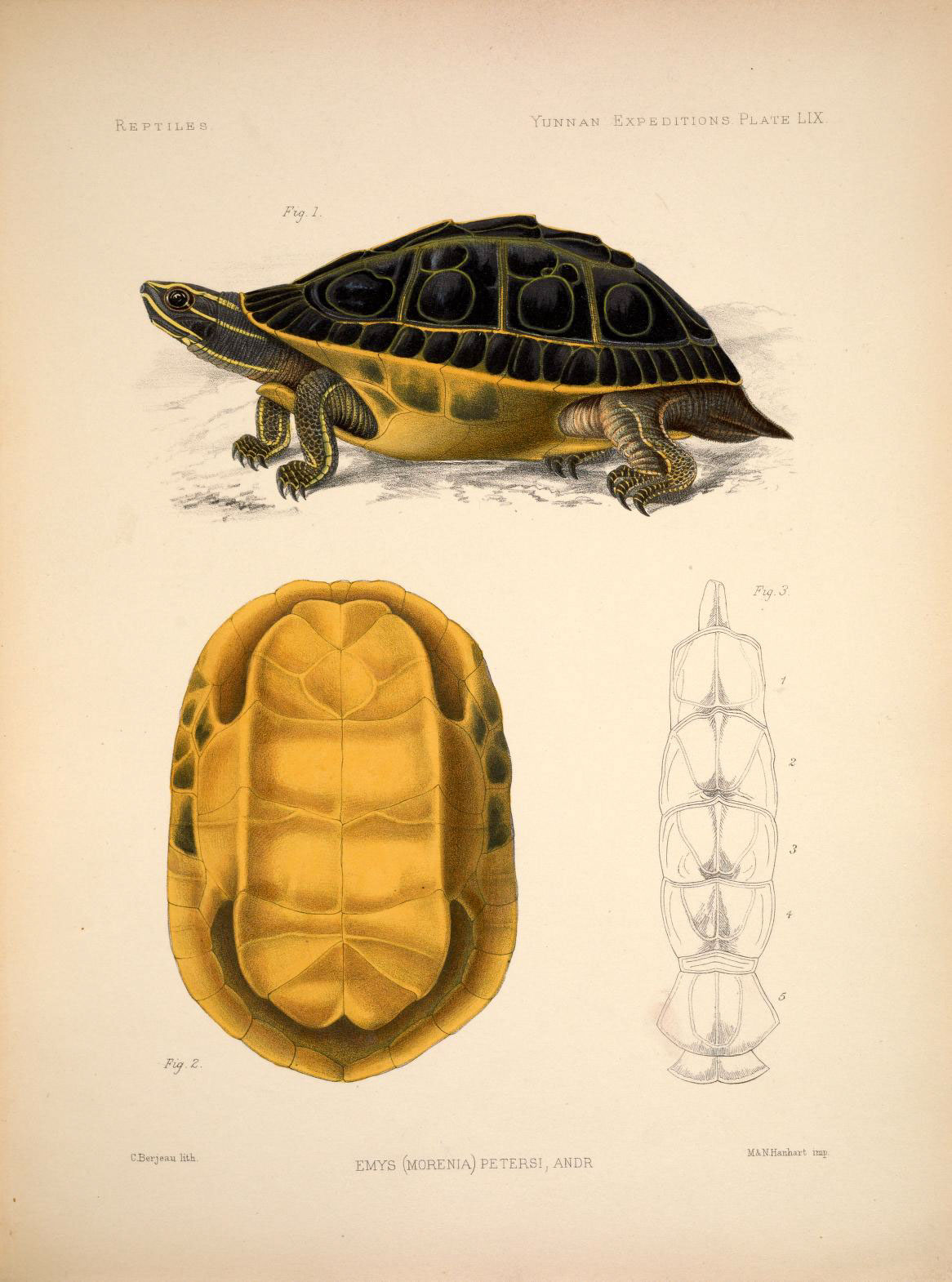
- Illustration of Morenia petersi

Conservation status
- Endangered (IUCN 3.1)
- CITES Appendix II

Scientific classification
- Kingdom: Animalia
- Phylum: Chordata
- Class: Reptilia
- Order: Testudines
- Suborder: Cryptodira
- Family: Geoemydidae
- Genus: Morenia
- Species: M. petersi

Binomial name
- Morenia petersi (Anderson, 1879)

Synonyms
- Batagur (Morenia) petersi Anderson, 1879

= Indian eyed turtle =

Species of turtle

The Indian eyed turtle (Morenia petersi) is a species of turtle in the family Geoemydidae. The species is native to South Asia.

== Geographic distribution ==
Morenia petersi is found in Bangladesh, northeastern India (as far west as Bihar), and in Nepal.

The type locality is Huzurapur (Jessore District), Faridpur, and Dhaka, Bangladesh.

== Etymology ==
The specific name, petersi, is in honour of German herpetologist Wilhelm Peters (1815–1883).

== Description ==
Morenia petersi is very closely allied to Morenia ocellata. The snout is much more pointed and relatively longer. The suture between the pectorals is not shorter than the suture between the abdominals. The carapace is black. Each vertebral has a narrow yellowish mesial line. The last four vertebrals have a yellowish linear horseshoe mark with both ends directed forward. All costals have an ocellus placed rather low and formed by a narrow yellowish line, above which are some irregular looped lines of similar colour. The nuchal and each marginal have a narrow, vertical yellowish mesial streak. The plastron is yellow. Three yellow streaks are on each side of the head, the lower one extending from below the nostril to the angle of the mouth. Males can achieve a straight-line carapace length up to 5 in (about 12 cm), females up to 8 in (about 20 cm).

== Habitat ==
The preferred natural habitat of Morenia petersi is bodies of fresh water, at elevations of 10–100 m (33–328 ft).

== Diet ==
Morenia petersi eats only soft plant material.

== Reproduction ==
Morenia petersi reaches sexual maturity at seven to eight years of age.

Mating of adults occurs in the winter months, and nesting follows in April–May. A clutch is made up of two eggs, each 34.6–35 mm x 22 mm (1.4 in x 0.9 in).
