= Cucaracha Formation =

Geologic formation in Panama

- Stratigraphic range: Early Burdigalian-Mid Langhian (Hemingfordian-Barstovian); 19–14 Ma
- Type: Formation
- Underlies: Pedro Miguel & La Boca Formations
- Overlies: Culebra Formation
- Thickness: ~125 m (410 ft)

Lithology
- Primary: Sandstone, conglomerate
- Other: Claystone

Location
- Coordinates: 9.0°N 79.6°W
- Approximate paleocoordinates: 8.4°N 77.5°W
- Region: Panamá Province
- Country: Panama
- Extent: Panama Basin
- Cucaracha Formation (Panama)

The Cucaracha Formation (Tca) is a geologic formation in Panama. It preserves vertebrate and plant fossils dating back to the Neogene period; Early to Middle Miocene epochs (Hemingfordian). Fossils of the crocodylian Centenariosuchus, the turtle Rhinoclemmys panamaensis and the artiodactyl Paratoceras have been found in the formation.

The Cucaracha Formation is approximately 125 metres (410 ft) thick, and dated to 19 to 14 Ma.

== Fossil content ==
Color key: Taxon / Reclassified taxon / Taxon falsely reported as present / Dubious taxon or junior synonym / Ichnotaxon / Ootaxon / Morphotaxon	Notes; Uncertain or tentative taxa are in small text; ~~crossed out~~ taxa are discredited.

=== Mammals ===
==== Bats ====
Bats reported from the Cucaracha Formation
Genus	Species	Presence	Material	Notes	Images
Americanycteris	A. cyrtodon	Centenario Bridge & Hodges Hill	Partial jaw & right premolar	A leaf-nosed bat, first reported as a new "large insectivorous phyllostomine"	

==== Carnivorans ====
Carnivorans reported from the Cucaracha Formation
Genus	Species	Presence	Material	Notes	Images
Bassaricyonoides	B. sp.	Gaillard Cut		A procyonid	
Daphoenodon	cf. D. sp.	Gaillard Cut		A bear dog	
Hemicyonidae indet.	Indeterminate	Gaillard Cut	Radius & ulna fragment	A bear	
Tomarctus	T. brevirostris	Gaillard Cut	Jaw & teeth	A borophagine dog	

==== Rodents ====
Rodents reported from the Cucaracha Formation
Genus	Species	Presence	Material	Notes	Images
Nototamias	N. sp.	Gaillard Cut		A ground squirrel	
Petauristodon	P. sp.	Gaillard Cut		A flying squirrel	
Proheteromys	P. sp.	Gaillard Cut		A heteromyid	
Texomys	T. stewarti	Pedro Miguel Lock & Gaillard Cut	Teeth	A jimomyid	

==== Ungulates ====
Ungulates reported from the Cucaracha Formation
Genus	Species	Presence	Material	Notes	Images
Anchitherium	A. clarencei	Gaillard Cut & Centenario Bridge	Mandible fragment, upper cheek tooth & maxilla	An equid	
Archaeohippus	A. sp.	Gaillard Cut	Calcaneus & tooth	An equid	
Cynorca	C. occidentale	Gaillard Cut, Centenario Bridge & Hodges Hill	Jaw elements with teeth	Species reassigned to the genus Tedfordhyus	
Floridaceras	F. whitei	Gaillard Cut	Jaws, teeth & femur fragment	A rhinoceros	
Floridatragulus	cf. F. nanus	Gaillard Cut		A camelid	
Machaeromeryx	cf. M. sp.	Gaillard Cut		A moschid	
Menoceras	M. barbouri	Gaillard Cut	Teeth & limb elements	A rhinoceros	
Merycochoerus	M. matthewi	Gaillard Cut	Skull elements	An oreodont	
Parablastomeryx	cf. P. sp.	Gaillard Cut		A moschid	
Paratoceras	P. coatesi	Gaillard Cut, Centenario Bridge, Hodges Hill & Cartagena Hill	Skull elements, teeth & limb fragments	A protoceratid, first reported as P. wardi	
Paratoceras	P. wardi	Gaillard Cut	Skull elements, teeth & limb fragments	Remains reassigned to P. coatesi	
Tedfordhyus	T. occidentalis	Gaillard Cut, Centenario Bridge & Hodges Hill	Jaw elements with teeth	A peccary, originally named Cynorca occidentale	

=== Reptiles ===
==== Birds ====
Birds reported from the Cucaracha Formation
Genus	Species	Presence	Material	Notes	Images
Accipitridae indet.	Indeterminate	West side of the Panama Canal	Talon	A large eagle, talon resembles those of the crowned eagle and martial eagle	

==== Crocodilians ====
Crocodilians reported from the Cucaracha Formation
Genus	Species	Presence	Material	Notes	Images
Centenariosuchus	C. gilmorei	Hodges Hill	Skull & jaw	A caiman	
Centenariosuchus	cf. C. gilmorei	Centenario Bridge	Right angular	A caiman	
Dadagavialis	D. gunai	East margin of the Panama Canal	Partial snout	A gavialid	
Dadagavialis	cf. D. gunai	Centenario Bridge	Partial mandible	A gavialid	
Eusuchia indet.	Indeterminate	Panama Canal Zone	Headless skeleton	Osteoderms comparable to those of gavialids such as Gavialosuchus, but crocodilian osteoderms are non-diagnostic	

==== Squamates ====
Squamates reported from the Cucaracha Formation
Genus	Species	Presence	Material	Notes	Images
Boa	B. cf. B. constrictor	Cartagena Hill & Hodges Hill	Incomplete vertebrae	A boid snake	

==== Turtles ====
Turtles reported from the Cucaracha Formation
Genus	Species	Presence	Material	Notes	Images
Podocnemididae indet.	Incertae sedis	Centenario Bridge	Right epiplastron	A side-necked turtle	
Rhinoclemmys	R. panamaensis	Centenario Bridge	Shell elements	A geoemydid turtle	
Rhinoclemmys	R. sp.	Centenario Bridge & Culebra Reach	Isolated bones	A geoemydid turtle	
Staurotypus	S. moschus	Centenario Bridge	Peripheral part of shell	A kinosternid turtle	
Testudinidae indet.	Incertae sedis	Culebra Reach	Shell & limb elements	A tortoise	
Trionychidae indet.	Incertae sedis	Centenario Bridge	Right costal	A softshell turtle	

=== Plants ===
Plants reported from the Cucaracha Formation
Genus	Species	Presence	Material	Notes	Images
Ampelorhiza	A. heteroxylon	Culebra Cut	Roots	A member of Paullinieae	
Antrocaryon	A. panamaensis	Lirio East	Endocarps	A member of Anacardiaceae	
Dracontomelon	D. montesii	Lirio East	Endocarps	A member of Anacardiaceae	
Guazumaoxylon	G. miocenica	Hodges Hill	Wood	A member of Malvaceae, similar to Guazuma	
Mammea	M. paramericana	Northern Lirio East	Stem	A member of Calophyllaceae	
Oreomunnea	O. grahamii	Lirio East	Nuts	A member of Juglandaceae	
Panascleroticoxylon	P. crystallosa	Hodges Hill	Wood	A member of Malpighiales	
Parinari	P. panamensis	Lirio East, Gold Hill & Empire sites	Endocarps	A member of Chrysobalanaceae	
Parinarioxylon	P. panamensis	Lirio East	Wood	A member of Chrysobalanaceae	
Periplanetoxylon	P. panamense	Hodges Hill	Wood	A member of Malvaceae	
Prioria	P. canalensis	Hodges Hill	Wood	A legume	
Prioria	P. hodgesii	Hodges Hill	Wood	A legume	
Rourea	R. blatta	Northern Lirio East site	Wood	A liana belonging to the Connaraceae	
Spondias	S. rothwellii	Lirio East	Endocarps	A member of Anacardiaceae	

== See also ==
- List of fossiliferous stratigraphic units in Panama
