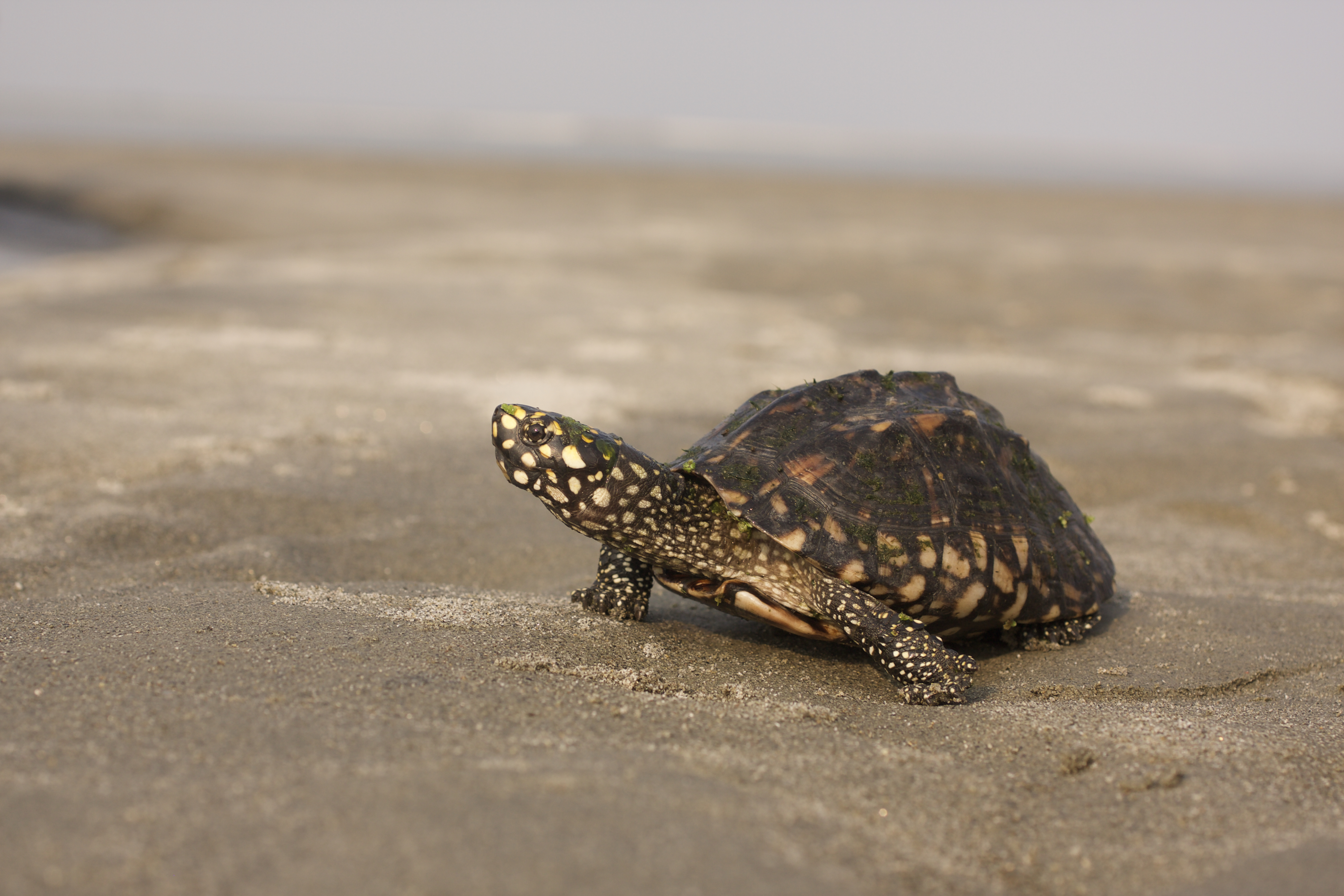

Conservation status
- Endangered (IUCN 3.1)
- CITES Appendix I

Scientific classification
- Kingdom: Animalia
- Phylum: Chordata
- Class: Reptilia
- Order: Testudines
- Suborder: Cryptodira
- Family: Geoemydidae
- Subfamily: Geoemydinae
- Genus: Geoclemys
- Species: G. hamiltonii

Binomial name
- Geoclemys hamiltonii (Gray, 1831)

Synonyms
- Emys hamiltonii Gray, 1831; Emys guttata Gray, 1831; Emys picquotii Lesson, 1831; Clemmys (Clemmys) hamiltonii — Fitzinger, 1835; Geoclemys hamiltonii — Gray, 1856; Damonia hamiltonii — Gray, 1869; Melanochelys pictus Murray, 1884; Clemmys palaeindica Lydekker, 1885; Damonia hamiltoni — Lydekker, 1889 (ex errore); Geoclemmys hamiltonii — Boulenger, 1889; Emys hamiltoni — M.A. Smith, 1931; Geoclemys hamiltoni — M.A. Smith, 1931

= Black pond turtle =

Species of turtle

The black pond turtle (Geoclemys hamiltonii), also known commonly as the spotted pond turtle and the Indian spotted turtle, is a species of freshwater turtle in the family Geoemydidae. The species, which is endemic to South Asia, belongs to the monotypic genus Geoclemys.

== Etymology ==
The specific name, hamiltonii, is in honor of Scottish botanist and ichthyologist Francis Hamilton.

== Description ==
G. hamiltonii is mainly black with small yellowish or white spots, and a much-elevated carapace, with three interrupted keels or series of nodose prominences corresponding to the vertebral and costal shields. The posterior border of the carapace is strongly serrated in young, but feebly in the adult. The nuchal is moderate, broader posteriorly than anteriorly. The first vertebral is not or scarcely broader anteriorly than posteriorly. The second and third vertebrals are broader than long in the young, nearly as long as broad in the adult, narrower than the costals. The plastron is large, angulate laterally, truncate anteriorly. The posterior lobe of the plastron is much narrower than the opening of the shell, nearly as long as the width of the bridge, deeply notched posteriorly. The head is rather large. The snout is very short, not projecting. The upper jaw is emarginated mesially. The width of the mandible at the symphysis nearly equals the horizontal diameter of the orbit. A large shield covers the upper surface of the snout and the crown, sometimes divided into three, one shield around the upper jaw and one on each side between the eye and the ear. The digits are webbed to the claws. The tail is extremely short. The shell is dark brown or blackish, elegantly marked with yellow spots and radiating streaks, and the soft parts are dark brown or blackish, with round yellow spots, largest on the head and neck.

Maximum straight carapace length is 41 cm (16 in).

== Diet ==
G. hamiltonii preys predominately upon snails, but also eats dragonfly larvae, other insects, freshwater crustaceans, and other animal and vegetable food items.

== Reproduction ==
G. hamiltonii is oviparous.

Each female lays two clutches per year. Clutch size is 12–36 eggs, and the second clutch is usually smaller than the first. Each hatchling has a straight carapace length of about 37 mm (1.5 in).

== Geographic range ==
G. hamiltonii is found in southern Pakistan (Indus, Ganges, Brahmaputra River drainages), northern India (Assam, Bihar, Jammu, Meghalaya, Punjab, Rajasthan, Uttar Pradesh, West Bengal), Sri Lanka, and Bangladesh.
