= Swamp turtle =

Swamp turtle or swamp terrapin may refer to:

- Burmese eyed turtle (Morenia ocellata)
- African helmeted turtle (Pelomedusa subrufa)
- West African mud turtle (Pelusios castaneus)
- Diamondback terrapin (Malaclemys terrapin)
- Western swamp turtle (Pseudemydura umbrina)
