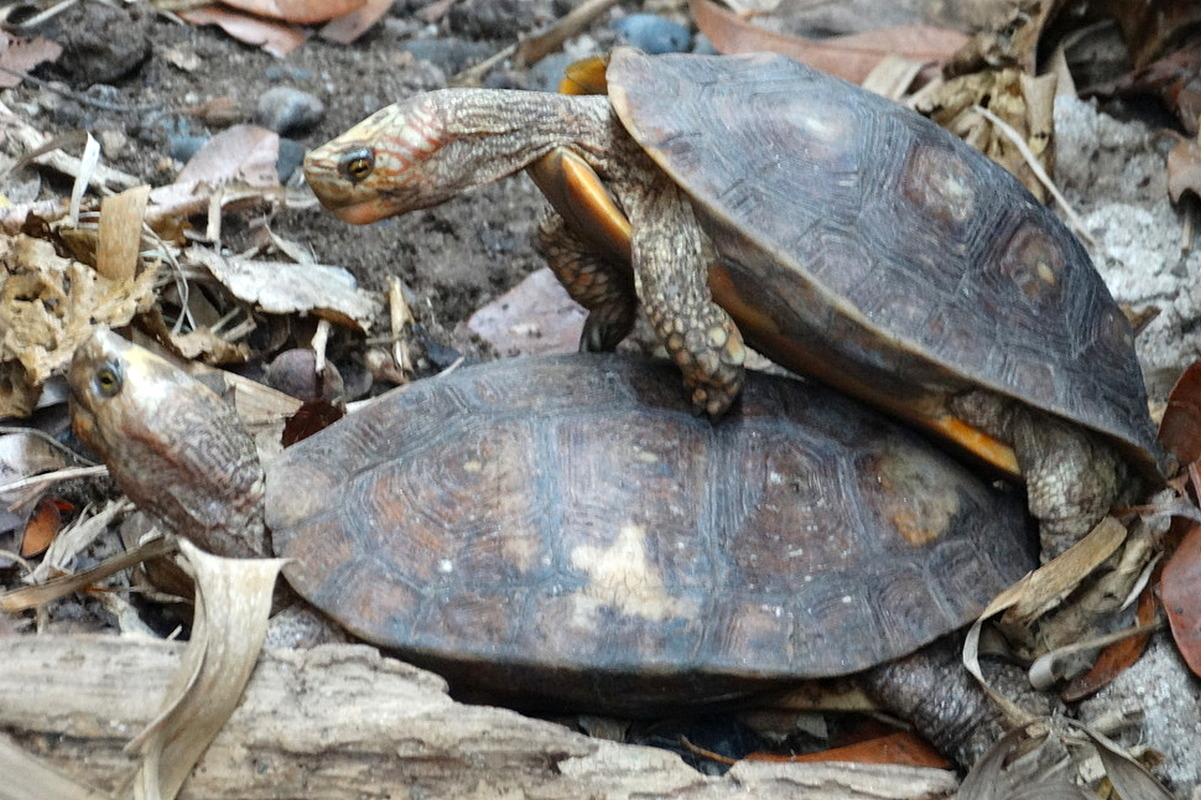
- Mating, in Oaxaca
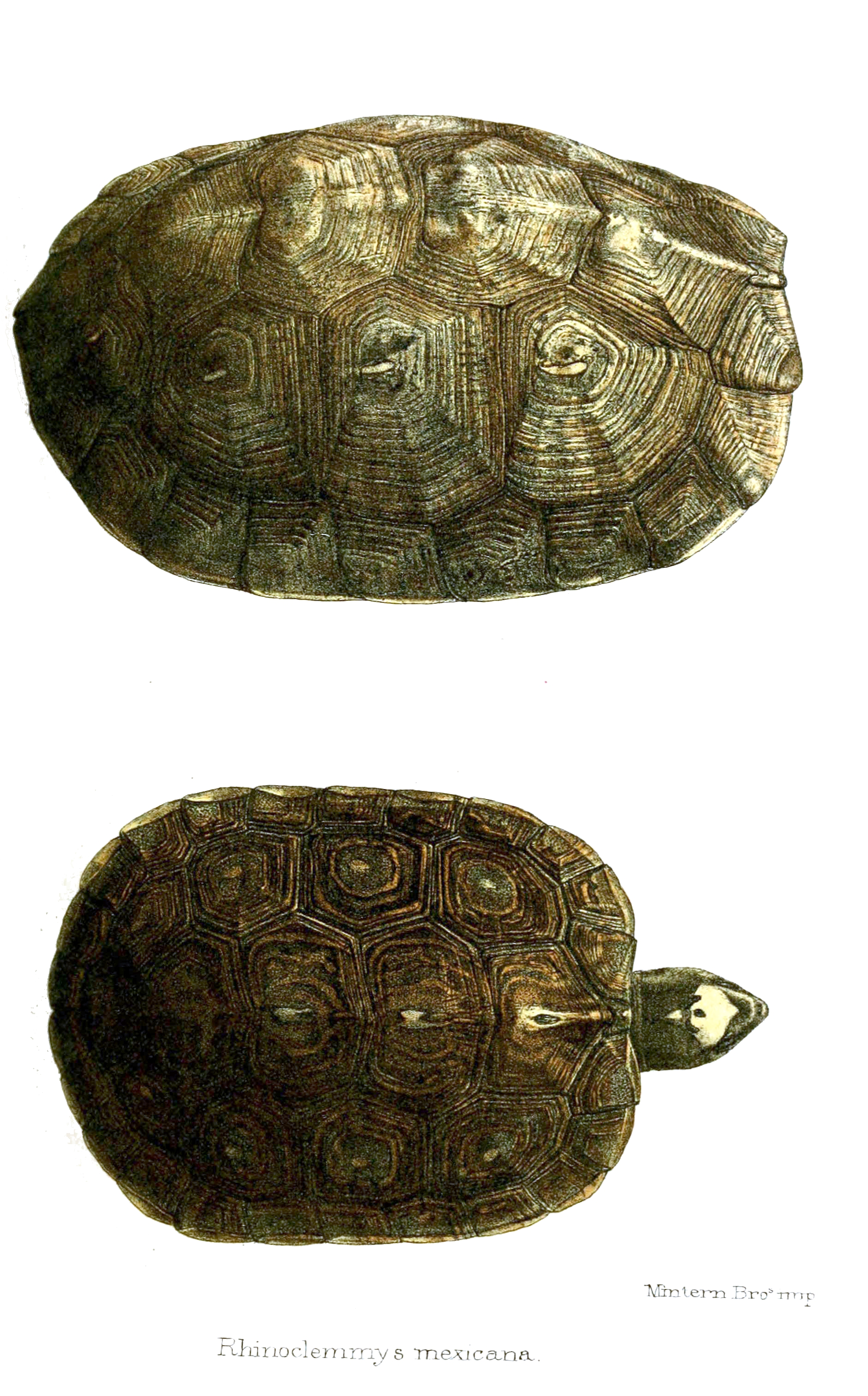
- 1871 illustration

Conservation status
- Vulnerable (IUCN 3.1)

Scientific classification
- Kingdom: Animalia
- Phylum: Chordata
- Class: Reptilia
- Order: Testudines
- Suborder: Cryptodira
- Family: Geoemydidae
- Genus: Rhinoclemmys
- Species: R. rubida

Binomial name
- Rhinoclemmys rubida (Cope, 1869)

Synonyms
- List: Chelopus rubidus Cope, 1870; Geoclemmys rubida Gray, 1870; Rhinoclemmys mexicana Gray, 1870; Chelopus mexicana Bocourt, 1876; Chelopus mexicanus Sumichrast, 1880; Emys mexicana Günther, 1885; Emys rubida Günther, 1885; Nicoria rubida Boulenger, 1889; Clemmys rubida Strauch, 1890; Nicoria rutila Gadow, 1905 (ex errore); Geoemyda rubida Siebenrock, 1909; Geoemyda rubida rubida Mosimann & Rabb, 1953; Rhinoclemys rubida McDowell, 1964; Rhinoclemmys rubida rubida Smith & Taylor, 1966; Callopsis rubida rubida Smith & Smith, 1975; Rhinoclemys rubida rubida Pritchard, 1979; Chelopus rubidus rubidus Bour, 2002; Geoemyda rubida perixantha Mosimann & Rabb, 1953; Rhinoclemmys rubida perixantha Smith & Taylor, 1966; Callopsis rubida perixantha Smith & Smith, 1975; Rhinoclemys rubida perixantha Pritchard, 1979; Rhinoclemmys rubida perixanthal Gosławski & Hryniewicz, 1993 (ex errore); Chelopus rubidus perixanthus Bour, 2002

= Mexican spotted wood turtle =

Species of turtle

The Mexican spotted wood turtle (Rhinoclemmys rubida) or Mexican spotted terrapin is a species of turtle in the family Geoemydidae.

It is endemic to Mexico. It inhabits the Pacific slope of southern Mexico, from sea level to 1350 meters elevation.

There are two recognized subspecies. R. rubida rubida ranges inhabits Oaxaca and Chiapas, and R. rubida perixantha inhabits Jalisco, Colima, Michoacán, and Guerrero.
