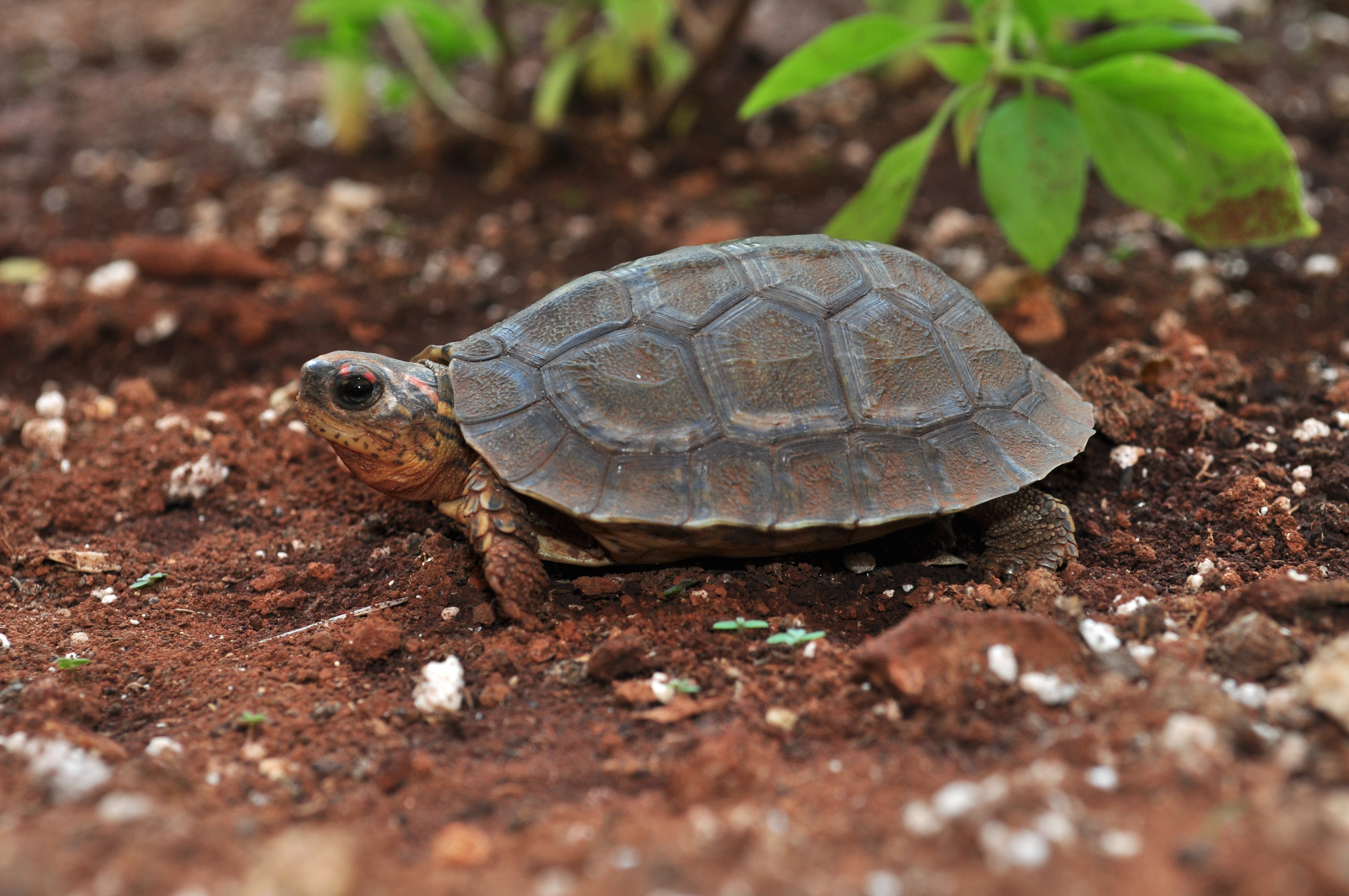

Conservation status
- Near Threatened (IUCN 3.1)

Scientific classification
- Kingdom: Animalia
- Phylum: Chordata
- Order: Testudines
- Suborder: Cryptodira
- Family: Geoemydidae
- Genus: Rhinoclemmys
- Species: R. areolata

Binomial name
- Rhinoclemmys areolata (Gray, 1860)

Synonyms
- Emys areolata Duméril & Bibron, 1851; Malaclemmys concentrica areolata Gray, 1856; Clemmys areolata Strauch, 1862; Malaclemys concentrica areolata Gray, 1863; Chelopus areolatus Cope, 1865; Nicoria punctularia var. areolata Boulenger, 1889; Geoemyda punctularia areolata Siebenrock, 1909; Geomyda punctularia areolata Ruthven, 1912; Geoemyda areolata Wettstein, 1934; Geomyda areolata Pearse, 1945; Rhinoclemys areolata McDowell, 1964; Rhinoclemmys areolata Smith & Taylor, 1966; Rhinoclemmys aereolata Hoffman, 1969 (ex errore); Callopsis areolata Smith & Smith, 1975; Chelopsus areolatus Ernst, 1980

= Furrowed wood turtle =

Species of turtle

The furrowed wood turtle (Rhinoclemmys areolata) is a species of turtle belonging to the genus Rhinoclemmys of the family Geoemydidae found in the Yucatán Peninsula and adjacent regions of Central America.

== Bibliography ==
- Rhodin, Anders G.J.; van Dijk, Peter Paul; Iverson, John B.; Shaffer, H. Bradley (2010-12-14). "Turtles of the World 2010 Update: Annotated Checklist of Taxonomy, Synonymy, Distribution and Conservation Status" (PDF). Archived from the original (PDF) on 2011-07-17.
- Fritz, Uwe; Havaš, Peter (2007-10-31). "Checklist of Chelonians of the World" (PDF). Archived from the original (PDF) on 2011-05-01.
