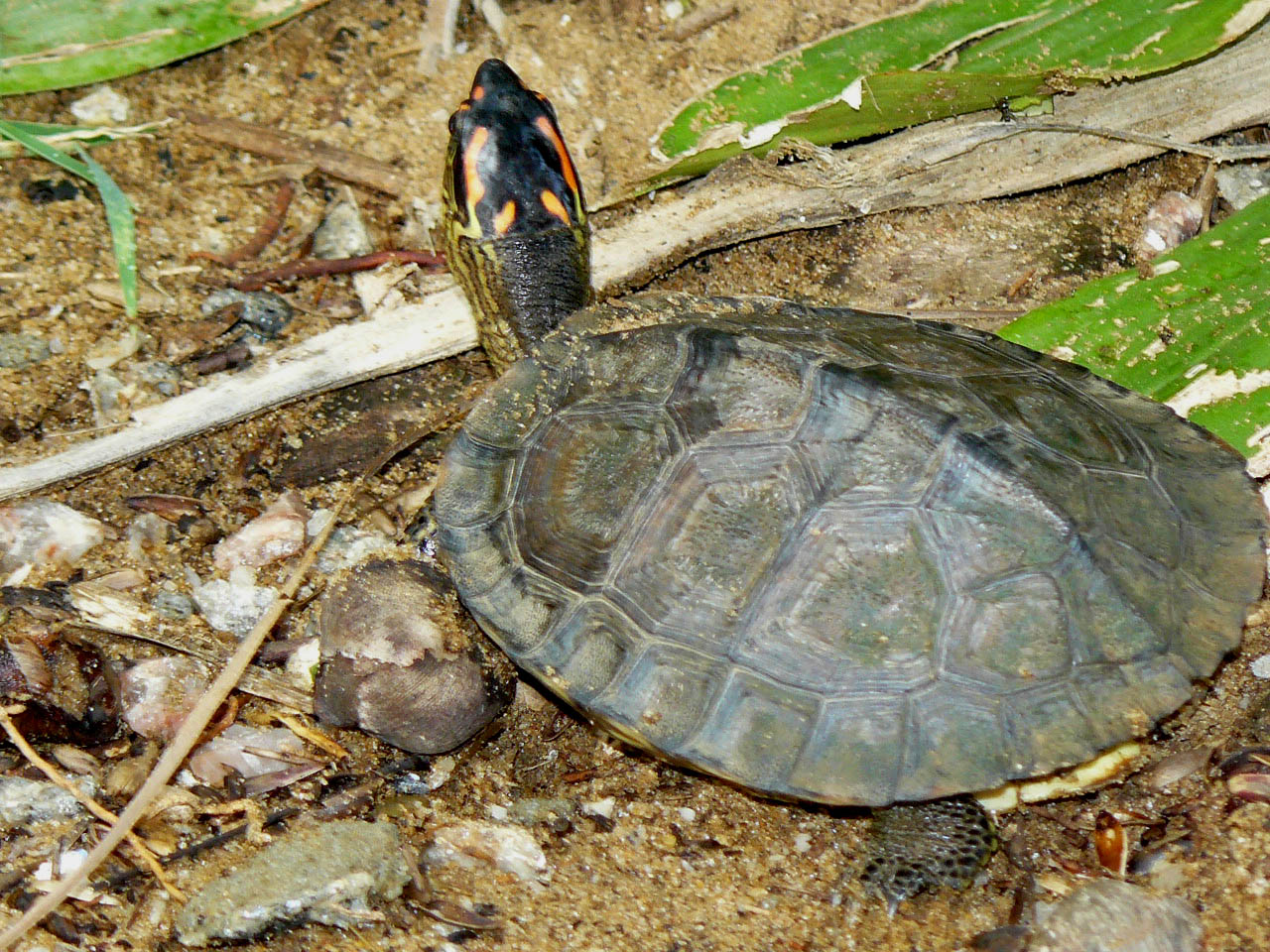

Conservation status
- Near Threatened (IUCN 3.1)

Scientific classification
- Kingdom: Animalia
- Phylum: Chordata
- Class: Reptilia
- Order: Testudines
- Suborder: Cryptodira
- Family: Geoemydidae
- Genus: Rhinoclemmys
- Species: R. punctularia

Binomial name
- Rhinoclemmys punctularia (Daudin, 1801)

Subspecies
- R. p. punctularia; R. p. flammigera

Synonyms
- Testudo punctularia Daudin, 1801; Testudo dorsata Schoepff, 1801; Emys dorsata Schweigger, 1812; Emys punctularia Schweigger, 1812; Chersine punctularia Merrem, 1820; Emys dorsualis Spix, 1824; Clemmys dorsata Wagler, 1830; Emys scabra Gray, 1831; Chemelys verrucosa Rafinesque, 1832; Clemmys (Clemmys) punctularia Fitzinger, 1835; Callopsis dorsalis Gray, 1863 (ex errore); Callopsis scabra Gray, 1863; Rhinoclemys bellii Gray, 1863; Rhinoclemys scabra Gray, 1863; Geoclemys callocephalus Gray, 1863; Clemmys callocephala Strauch, 1865; Chelopus punctularius Cope, 1865; Geoclemmys callocephala Gray, 1870; Geoclemmys callocephalus Gray, 1870; Rhinoclemmys scabra Gray, 1870; Rhinoclemmys bellii Gray, 1870; Rhinoclemmys scabra var. bellii Gray, 1872; Rhinoclemys callocephala Gray, 1873; Rhinoclemys lunata Gray, 1873; Rhinoclemys ventricosa Gray, 1873; Nicoria punctularia Boulenger, 1889; Geoemyda [punctularia] punctularia Siebenrock, 1909; Geomyda punctularia Luederwaldt, 1926; Emys puntularia Pearse, 1945 (ex errore); Geoemyda punctularia lunata Mertens, 1954; Rhinoclemmys punctularia punctularia Fróes, 1957; Rhinoclemys punctularia McDowell, 1964; Callopsis punctularia lunata Smith, Smith & Sawin, 1976; Callopsis punctularia punctularia Smith, Smith & Sawin, 1976; Rhinoclemmys lunata Fretey, Hoogmoed & Lescure, 1977; Rhinoclemmys punctularia Fretey, Hoogmoed & Lescure, 1977; Rhinoclemmys punctularia lunata Fretey, Hoogmoed & Lescure, 1977; Rhinoclemmys punctularia flammigera: Rhinoclemmys punctularia flammigera Paolillo, 1985

= Spot-legged wood turtle =

Species of turtle

The painted wood turtle or spot-legged wood turtle (Rhinoclemmys punctularia) is a species of turtle belonging to the genus Rhinoclemmys of the family Geoemydidae.

== Distribution ==
The painted wood turtle can be found in Brazil, French Guiana, Guyana, Suriname, Trinidad and Tobago and Venezuela.

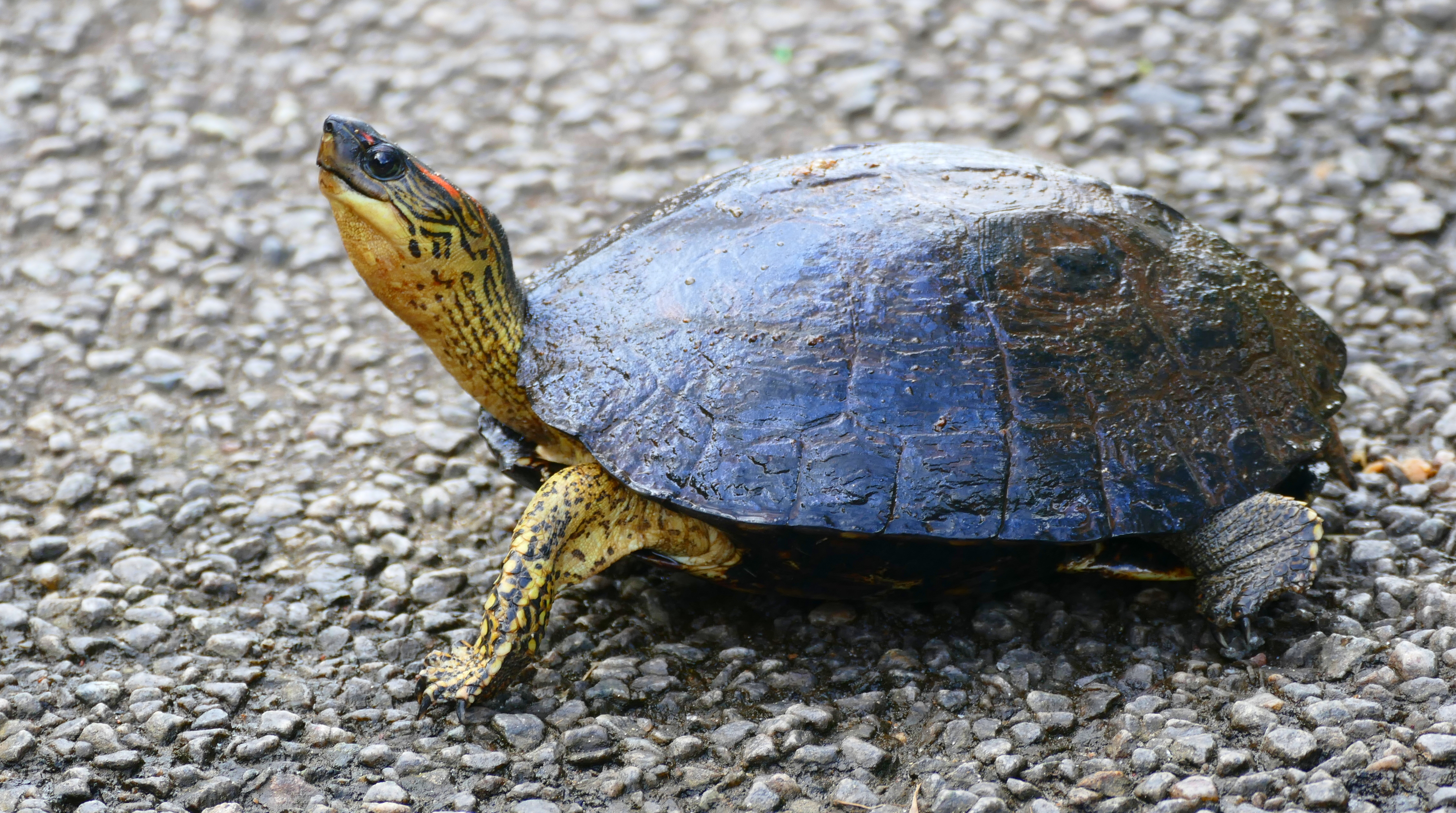

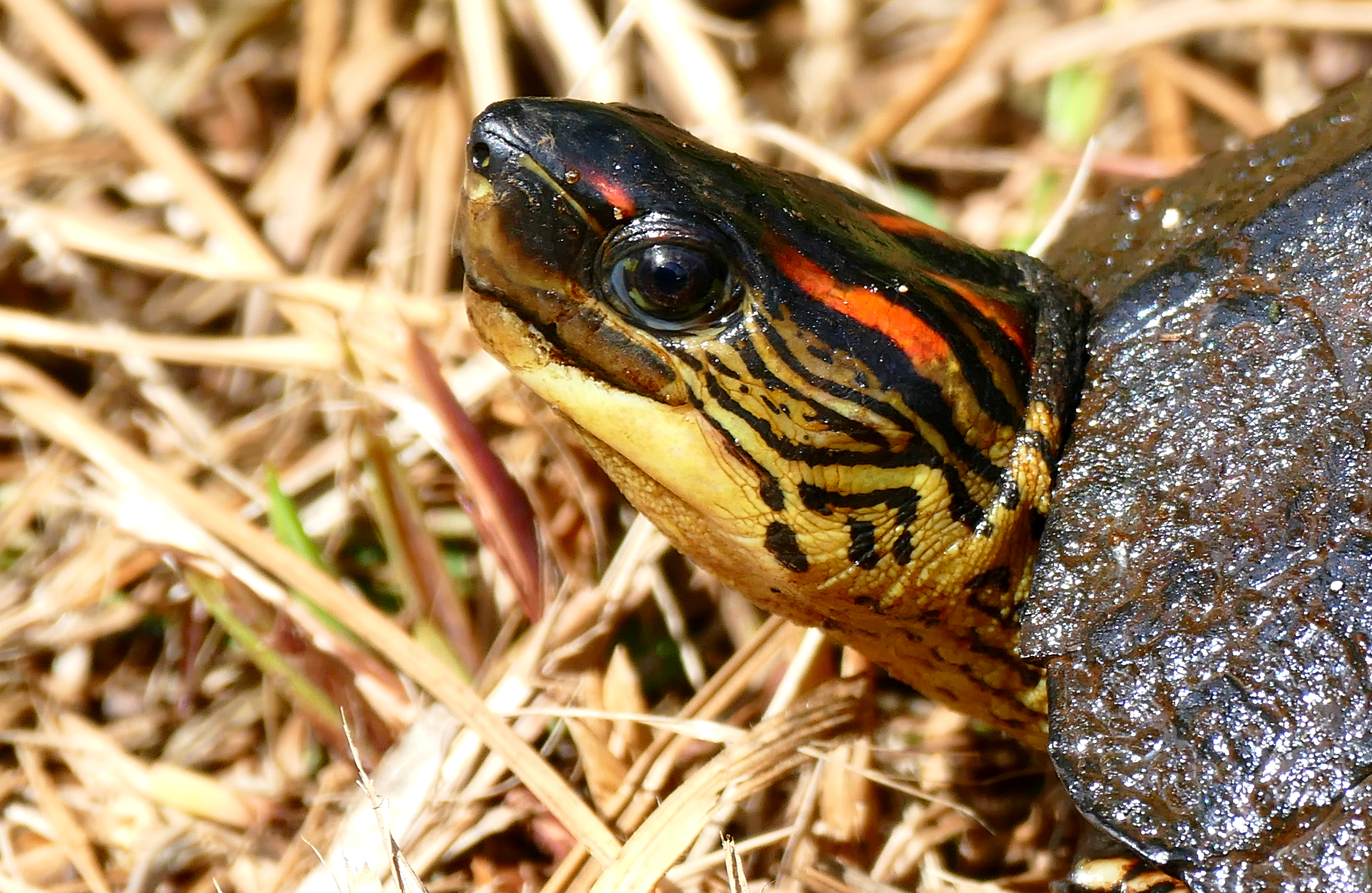

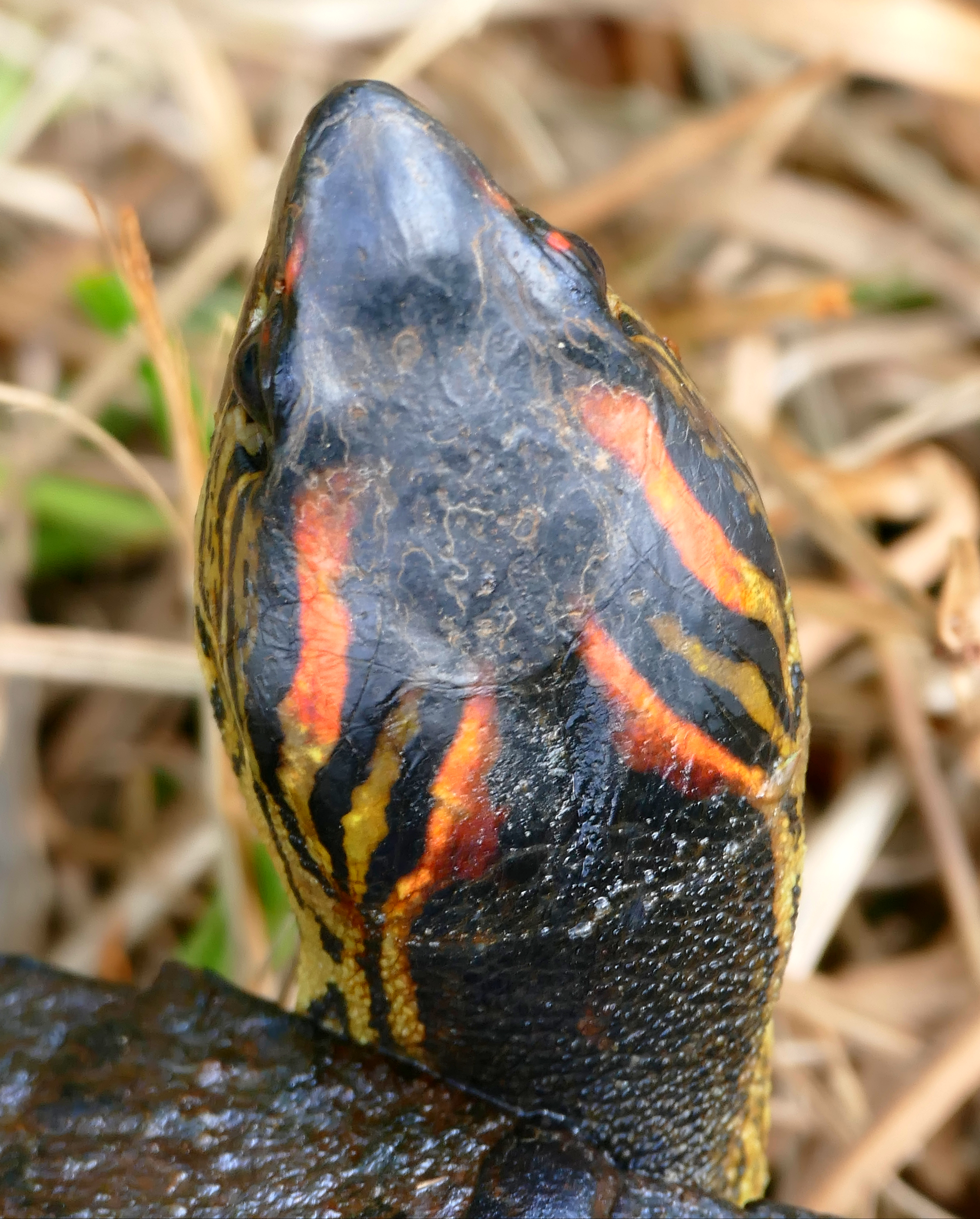

== Bibliography ==
- Rhodin, Anders G.J.; van Dijk, Peter Paul; Iverson, John B.; Shaffer, H. Bradley (2010-12-14). "Turtles of the World 2010 Update: Annotated Checklist of Taxonomy, Synonymy, Distribution and Conservation Status" (PDF). Archived from the original (PDF) on 2011-07-17.
- Fritz, Uwe; Havaš, Peter (2007-10-31). "Checklist of Chelonians of the World" (PDF). Archived from the original (PDF) on 2011-05-01.
