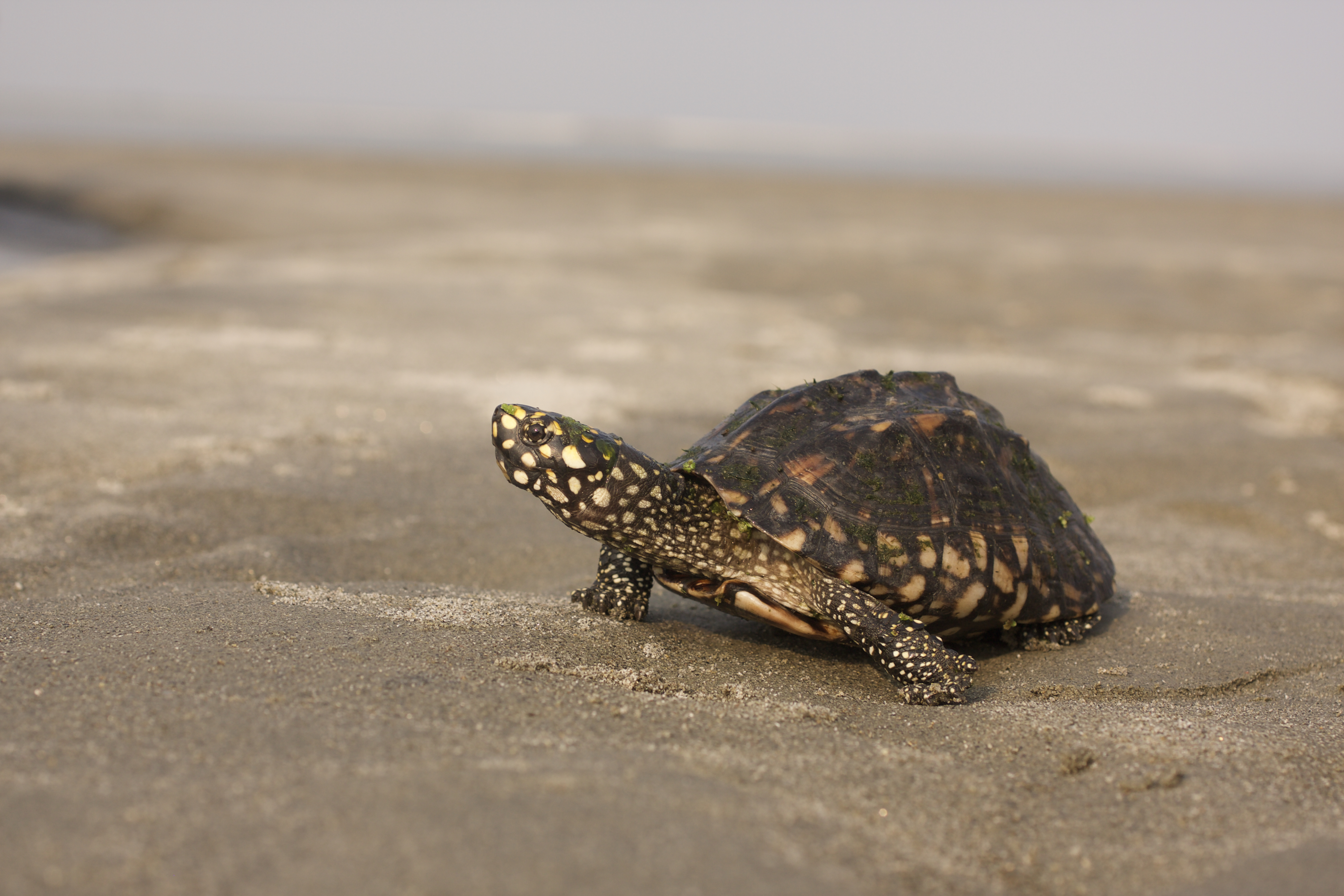
- Geoclemys hamiltonii

Scientific classification
- Kingdom: Animalia
- Phylum: Chordata
- Class: Reptilia
- Order: Testudines
- Suborder: Cryptodira
- Family: Geoemydidae
- Subfamily: Geoemydinae
- Genus: Geoclemys; Gray, 1856

Species
- Geoclemys hamiltonii (Gray, 1831); †Geoclemys matuuraensis; †Geoclemys yudaensis

= Geoclemys =

Genus of turtle

Geoclemys is a genus of turtle in the family Geoemydidae. The genus contains a single living species, the black pond turtle (Geoclemys hamiltonii). Two fossil species are also known from the Miocene of Japan: Geoclemys matuuraensis and Geoclemys yudaensis.

== Etymology ==
The specific name, hamiltonii, is in honor of Francis Buchanan-Hamilton, who was a Scottish botanist and ichthyologist.
