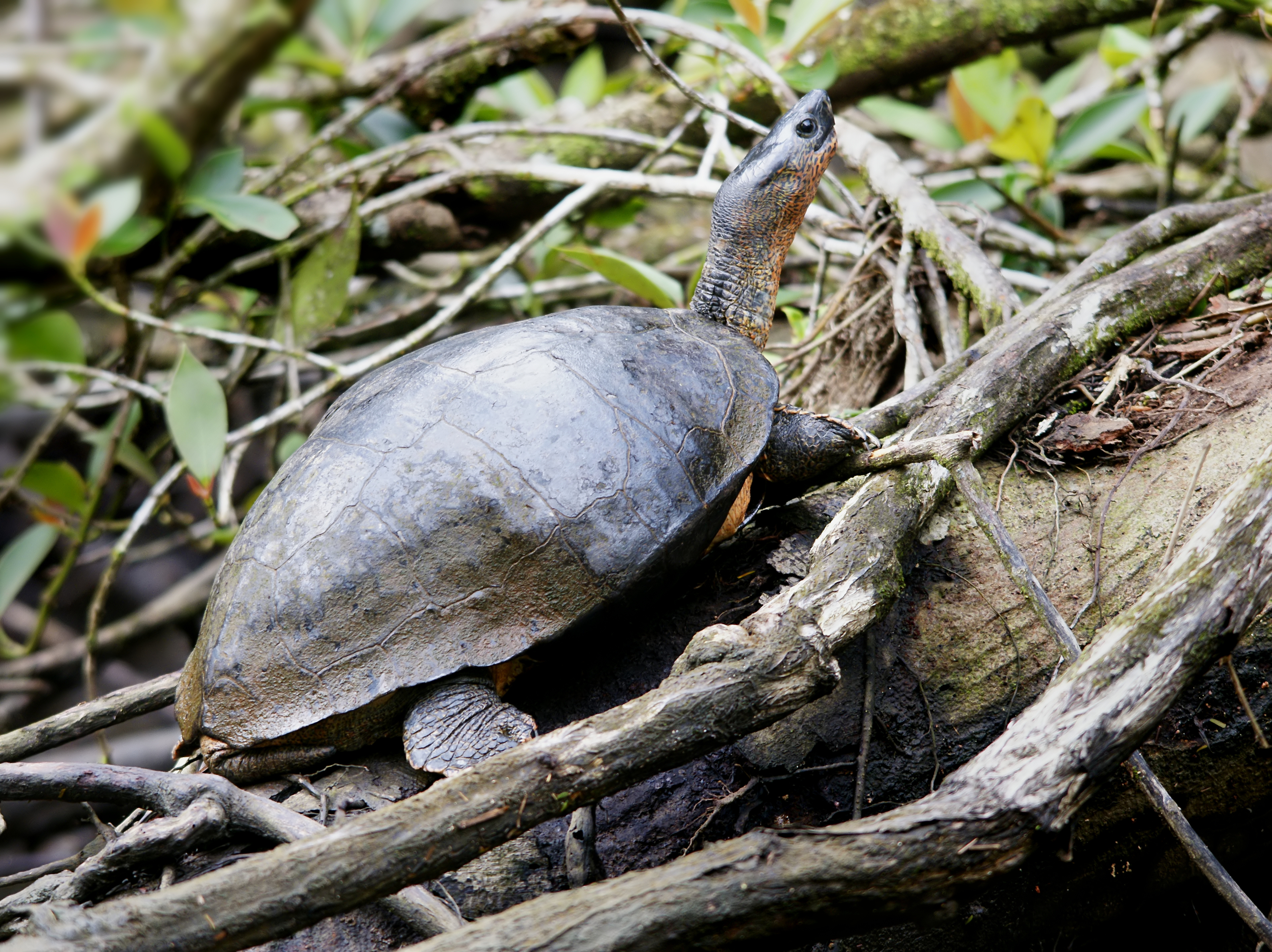

Conservation status
- Least Concern (IUCN 3.1)

Scientific classification
- Kingdom: Animalia
- Phylum: Chordata
- Class: Reptilia
- Order: Testudines
- Suborder: Cryptodira
- Family: Geoemydidae
- Genus: Rhinoclemmys
- Species: R. funerea

Binomial name
- Rhinoclemmys funerea (Cope, 1875)

Synonyms
- Chelopus funereus Cope, 1876; Emys funerea Günther, 1885; Geoemyda funerea Dunn, 1930; Geoemyda costaricensis Kanberg, 1930; Geoemyda punctularia funerea Mertens, Müller & Rust, 1934; Rhinoclemys funerea McDowell, 1964; Geomyda funerea Campbell & Howell, 1965; Geoemydia funeria Fairchild, Kohls & Tipton, 1966 (ex errore); Rhinoclemmys funerea Meyer & Wilson, 1973; Callopsis funerea Smith, Smith & Sawin, 1976

= Black wood turtle =

Species of turtle

The black wood turtle (Rhinoclemmys funerea), or black river turtle is one of nine species of turtle in the genus Rhinoclemmys, which is in the family Geoemydidae. It is found in Costa Rica, Honduras, Nicaragua, and Panama.
