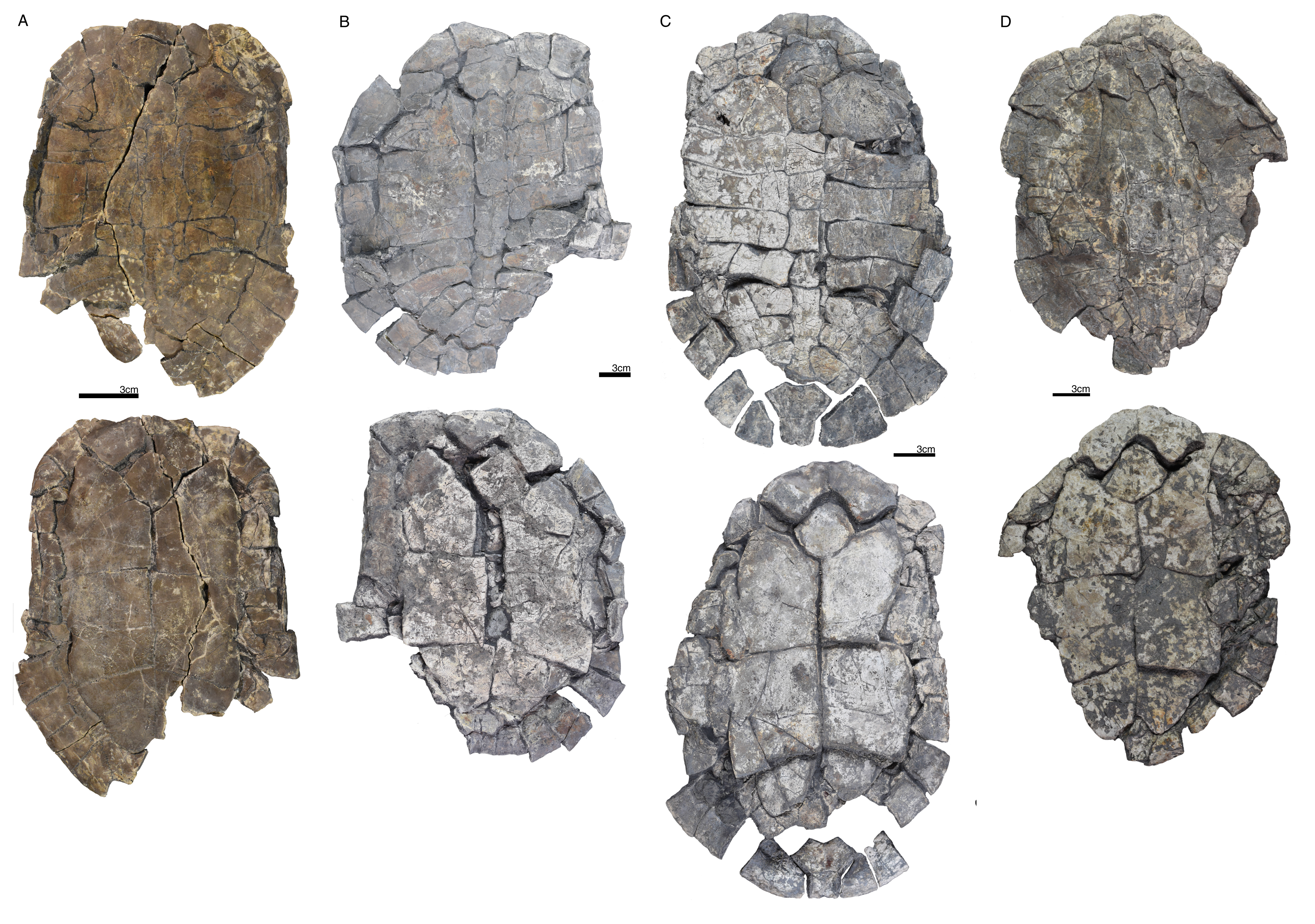

Scientific classification
- Kingdom: Animalia
- Phylum: Chordata
- Class: Reptilia
- Order: Testudines
- Suborder: Cryptodira
- Family: Geoemydidae
- Genus: †Banhxeochelys; Garbin, 2019

Species
- †Banhxeochelys trani Garbin, 2019

= Banhxeochelys =

Banhxeochelys Temporal range: mid to late Eocene

Extinct genus of turtles

Banhxeochelys is an extinct genus of Geoemydid turtles that lived during the middle to late Eocene of Vietnam. The type and only species is Banhxeochelys trani. The genus name origin is from the pancake-like Vietnamese dish bánh xèo and the Latin chelys, meaning turtle in Greek. The specific name honors Đặng Ngọc Trần, the retired director of the International Cooperation Division of the Department of Geology and Minerals of Vietnam. The fossils of Banhxeochelys were found in Na Duong coal mine of Lạng Sơn Province. The type locality of Banhxeochelys yielded more than 100 turtles, but only the 30 best-preserved specimens (14 adults, 8 subadults and 8 juveniles) were described and identified as Banhxeochelys because the rest are too fragmentary or poorly preserved for useful morphological data.
