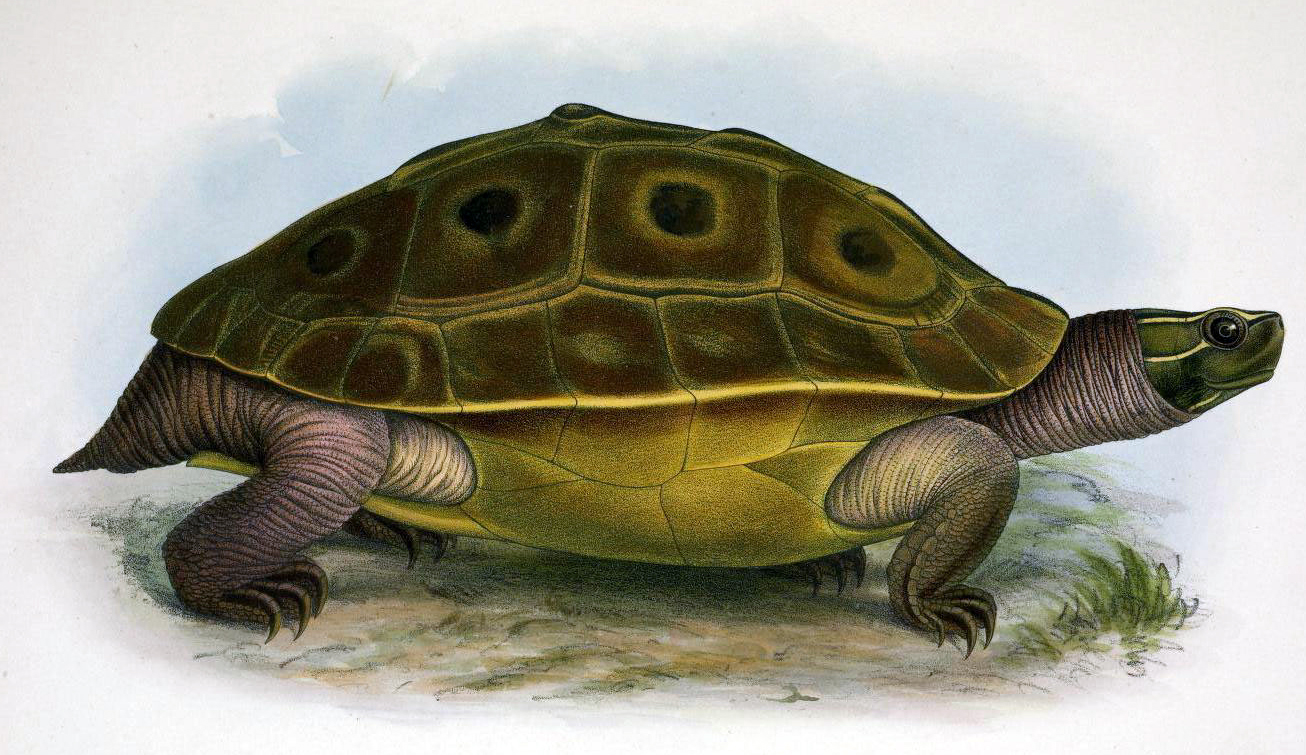
- M. ocellata

Scientific classification
- Domain: Eukaryota
- Kingdom: Animalia
- Phylum: Chordata
- Class: Reptilia
- Order: Testudines
- Suborder: Cryptodira
- Superfamily: Testudinoidea
- Family: Geoemydidae
- Subfamily: Geoemydinae
- Genus: Morenia; Gray, 1870

Species
- Morenia ocellata; Morenia petersi

= Morenia =

Genus of turtles

Morenia is a genus of turtles in the family Geoemydidae found in India, Bangladesh, and Burma. It contains only these species:

- Burmese eyed turtle (M. ocellata)
- Indian eyed turtle (M. petersi)

It is also in the name of a Robotic Operating System (ROS) distribution release: Melodic Morenia.
