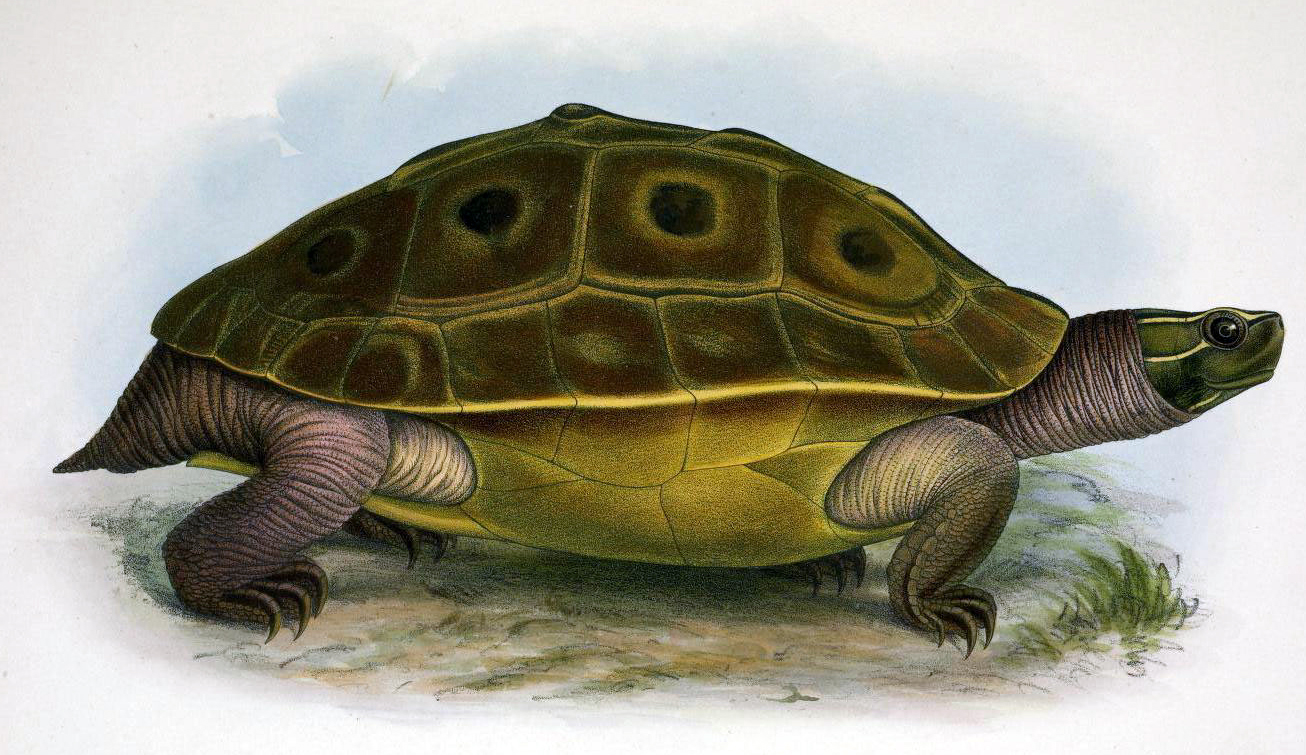
- Lithograph from 1878

Conservation status
- Endangered (IUCN 3.1)
- CITES Appendix I

Scientific classification
- Kingdom: Animalia
- Phylum: Chordata
- Class: Reptilia
- Order: Testudines
- Suborder: Cryptodira
- Family: Geoemydidae
- Genus: Morenia
- Species: M. ocellata

Binomial name
- Morenia ocellata (Duméril & Bibron, 1835)

Synonyms
- List: Emys ocellata Duméril & Bibron, 1835; Batagur (Kachuga) ocellata Gray, 1856; Emys berdmorei Blyth, 1859; Emys berdmorii Blyth, 1859 (ex errore); Clemmys ocellata Strauch, 1862; Batagur berdmorii Blyth, 1863; Batagur berdmoreii Theobald, 1868 (ex errore); Kachuga berdmoorei Gray, 1869 (ex errore); Morenia berdmorei Gray, 1870; Morenia ocellata Gray, 1870; Batagur berdmorei Boulenger, 1889; Kachuga berdmorei Boulenger, 1889

= Burmese eyed turtle =

Species of turtle

The Burmese eyed turtle (Morenia ocellata), also known as the Bengal eyed terrapin, Burmese peacock turtle or swamp turtle, is a species of turtle in the family Geoemydidae of southern Asia, commonly found in Myanmar. The Burmese eyed turtle is an aquatic and herbivorous species.

== Taxonomy and morphology ==
=== Taxonomy ===
Initially, the Burmese eyed turtle was named Emys Ocellata, by taxonomists Duméril and Bibrion in 1835. The turtle was named this due to the prominent, deep spots on the vertebral and costal scutes, which the scientists were referencing. The scientific name was then changed to Morenia ocellata throughout history. The closest living relative to Moreina ocellata is the Indian-Eyed turtle, Morenia petersi, who originated in northeastern India and Bangladesh.

=== Morphology ===
==== Carapace and plastron ====
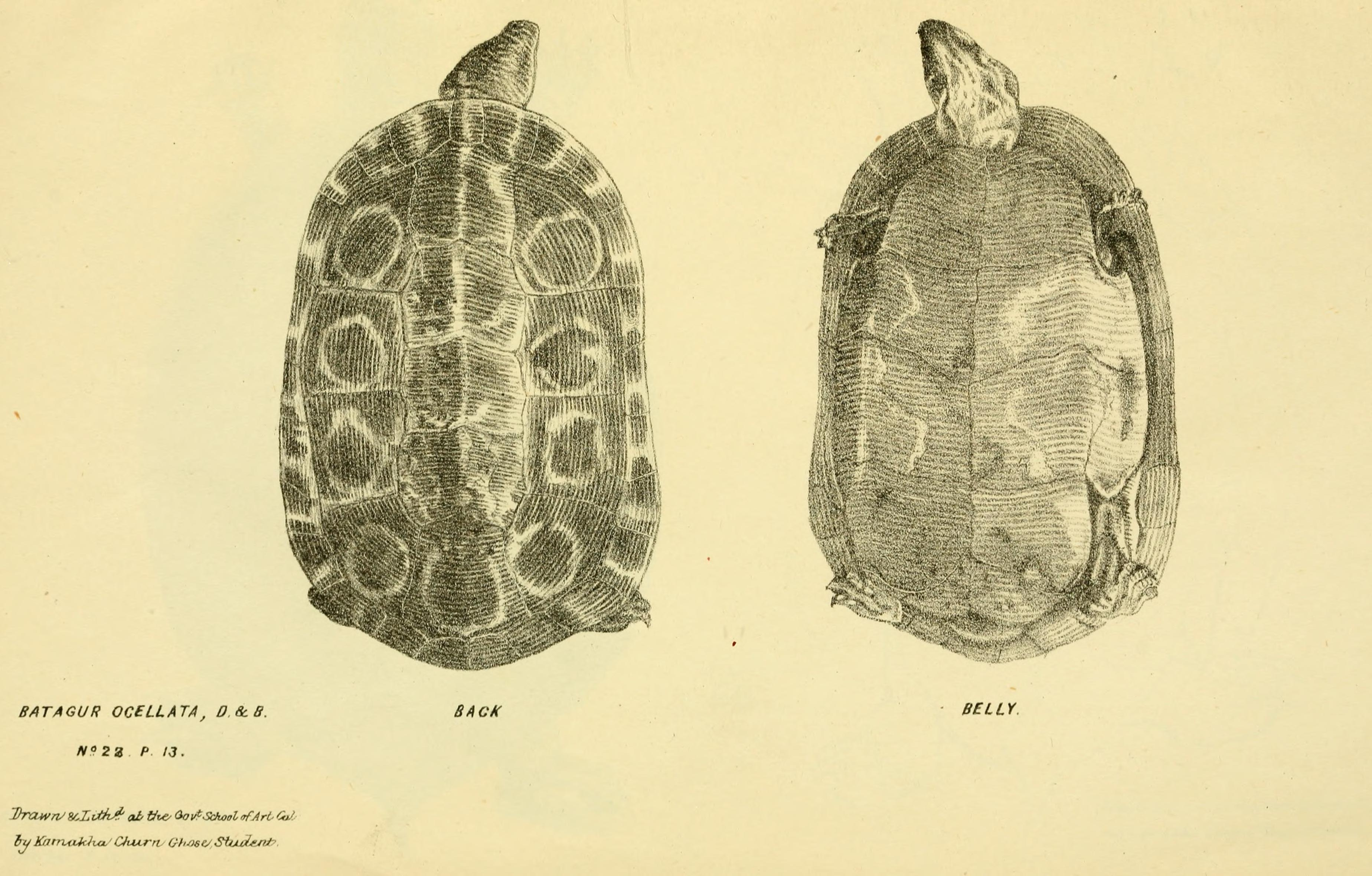
M. ocellata carapace (left figure) and plastron (right figure)

The Burmese eyed turtle is deemed as a small turtle, with a carapace length up to 239 mm. The carapace, in young turtles, is distinguished by vertebral tubercles. Tubercles are bumps on the shell surface. However, the shell of adult turtles is less tuberculated and more low to the ground. The carapace can appear olive-colored, dark brown, or grayish-black. Dark centered ocelli with yellow borders can be seen on costal and vertebral scutes, being more prominent in youthful turtles. The nuchal scute, near the front of the carapace, is long and narrow. The rim of the shell is smooth.

The plastron is long and has a minimal keel, a raised ridge, where the bridge meets the plastron. This keel is absent in females that are large in size. The plastron does not have a pattern, and is instead plain yellow. The yellow color can vary across the color spectrum, and can appear in various shades, ranging from a very pale yellow to a dark yellow. The plastron is truncate anteriorly. An anal notch is present on the posterior end.

The mineralized skeleton of the Burmese eyed turtle contains apatite, which is a calcium-phosphate mineral.

==== Head, skull, and snout ====
One large scale covers the head of M. ocellata, and one scale behind both eyes. On the upper surface of the neck, there are small, rounded papillae that are black in color. The head of M. ocellata is either olive or dark grayish-brown in color. There is also a yellow stripe running from the tip of the snout to the neck, as well as a second yellow stripe from the posterior corner of the orbit to the neck.

The skull is considered to be small. The skull of M. ocellata has a short supra-occipital crest and extremely developed jaw surfaces. Burmese eyed turtles hear via otoliths. Otoliths are found in the inner-ear portion of the turtle, and detects acceleration and acoustic signals.

The snout of M. ocellata is considered to be short and pointy. The jaw margins are serrated, which appears saw-like. The upper jaw is anteriorly bicuspid, and on the lower jaw, there is a symphysial hook. Behind the jaw, there are very small scales, accompanied by two mental glands.

==== Sexual dimorphism ====
Male Burmese eyed turtles are smaller than their female counterparts. Female carapaces may grow to lengths of up to 239 mm, while male carapaces only grow up to lengths of 135-50 mm. The tails of male turtles, however, are larger than female turtles. Males, compared to females, are more domed and narrower.

== Distribution and habitat ==
Originally, M. ocellata was suspected to inhabited West Bengal and Bangladesh, but that was found to be false. It is endemic to Burma and possibly in Yunnan, China. It is commonly found in the city of Yangon, which is in Myanmar.

=== Population status ===
In the 19th century, this species was described as extremely abundant in the areas of Pegu (Bago) and Tenassarium. In these areas, large amounts of Burmese eyed turtles were caught by local peoples. In 1989, the Burmese eyed turtle was reported as being one of the most abundant turtles in the Yagnon area. However, the status of present-day wild Burmese eyed turtles remains unknown.

M. ocellata's population is considered to be declining because of its decrease in the food market. From 1996 to 1997, the Burmese eyed turtle represented 10 tons per day of food at its peak season, but then vanished from markets in 1998. The reduction in population is estimated to be greater than 50%, but are still commonly found in certain areas of Myanmar. The Burmese eyed turtle can also be found in Chinese food and medicinal markets.

=== Habitat and Diet ===
The Burmese eyed turtle is found in tropical mangrove swamps, paddy fields, streams, ponds, and slow-flowing portions of rivers. The most common habitat for M. ocellata is inundated plains in lower Myanmar. Inundated plains are low-lying areas that border bodies of water, and are also called floodplains. During the summer months, inundated plains dry up, leaving behind a cover of thick grass. Some turtles can also be found in grass plains.

The Burmese eyed turtle is a herbivore, meaning it only eats plants, commonly found in shallow water where they reside. They do not eat any form of other animals.

== Reproduction ==
M. ocellata reproduces sexually. They are an oviparous species, meaning they lay eggs.

The Burmese eyed turtle's nesting process occurs between September and April, which is considered to be Myanmar's dry season. The clutch size fluctuates from 5-15 eggs. Hatchlings are mobile directly out of the egg.

== Threats and conservation efforts ==
=== Historic threats ===
Historically, M. ocellata was caught on a large scale to feed Burmese peoples during March or April by setting their habitat, grass plains, on fire. Some turtles were also captured and brought to temples in the city of Yagnon, Myanmar. Both of these efforts drained wild Burmese eyed turtle populations.

=== Current day threats ===
The Burmese eyed turtle is considered endangered, according to IUCN Red List. Threats of the Burmese eyed turtle include habitat destruction, habitat degradation, and market consumption. A big contributor to the overall decline of the M. ocellata population is the international exotic pet trade. Although this industry has diminished due to conservation efforts, some turtles can still be found in aquariums and pet stores in Yagnon, Myanmar. However, M. ocellata makes "disappointing pets". The shell of the Burmese eyed turtle is very thin, making abrasions to the bony shell extremely common. Burmese eyed turtles are not commonly found in the Americas, but at least four living turtles were found in the San Diego Zoo in California.

They are also used as religious offering to pagoda ponds, which are a part of Buddhist temple complexes. Even today, some people in western and southern parts of Myanmar consume Burmese eyed turtles, despite them being endangered. They are also traded internationally from Myanmar to China for illegal consumption.

=== Conservation efforts ===
In Myanmar, the Burmese eyed turtle is protected under the Myanmar Wildlife Law, created in 1994 and the Myanmar Fisheries Law, created in 1993. Conservation efforts include captive breeding and assurance colonies.
