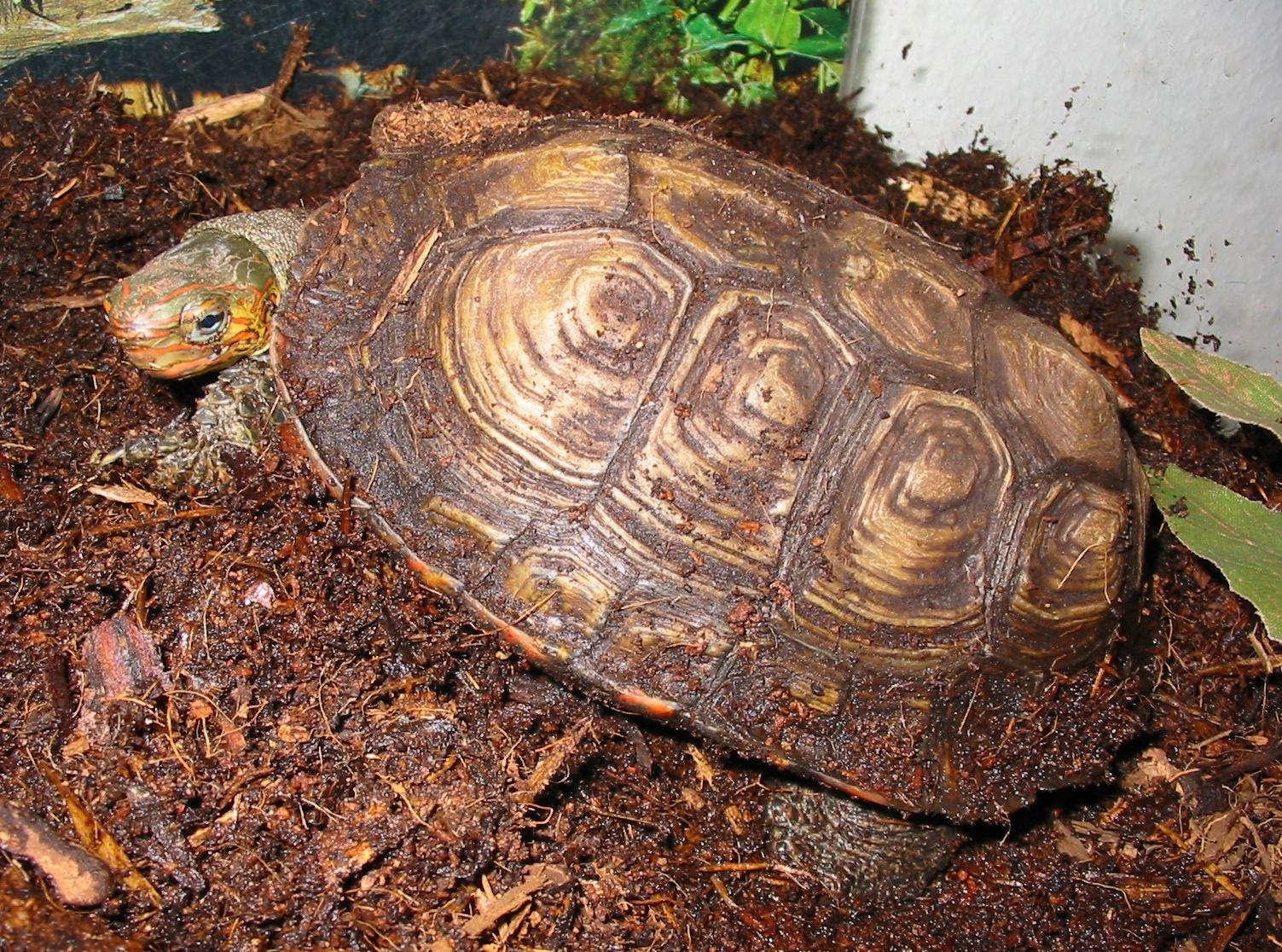
- Rhinoclemmys pulcherrima, painted wood turtle

Scientific classification
- Kingdom: Animalia
- Phylum: Chordata
- Class: Reptilia
- Order: Testudines
- Suborder: Cryptodira
- Family: Geoemydidae
- Subfamily: Rhinoclemmydinae
- Genus: Rhinoclemmys; Fitzinger 1835

= Rhinoclemmys =

Rhinoclemmys Temporal range: Early Miocene-Recent ~19–0 Ma

Genus of turtles

Rhinoclemmys is a genus of turtles in the family Geoemydidae (formerly Bataguridae), the only genus in the subfamily Rhinoclemmydinae. Member species of the genus are commonly known as the Neotropical wood turtles and are the only geoemydids known from the Americas. As such, they have adapted to a wide range of habitats, which is reflected in the species' common names.

== Species ==
The genus Rhinoclemmys contains the following extant and fossil species which are recognized as being valid:

- R. annulata (Gray 1860) – brown wood turtle
- R. areolata (A.M.C. Duméril & Bibron in A.M.C. Duméril & A.H.A. Duméril, 1851) – furrowed wood turtle
- R. diademata (Mertens 1954) – Maracaibo wood turtle
- R. funerea (Cope 1876) – black river turtle
- R. melanosterna (Gray 1861) – Colombian wood turtle
- R. nasuta (Boulenger 1902) – large-nosed wood turtle
- R. pulcherrima (Gray 1856) – painted wood turtle
- R. punctularia (Daudin 1801) – spot-legged wood turtle
- R. rubida (Cope 1870) – Mexican spotted wood turtle
- †R. panamaensis Cadena et al. 2012 - Hemingfordian - Cucaracha Formation, Panama

Nota bene: A binomial authority in parentheses indicates that the species was originally described in a genus other than Rhinoclemmys.

== Bibliography ==
- Cadena, E.; Bourque, J.R.; Rincón, A.F.; Bloch, J.I.; Jaramillo, C.A.; MacFadden, B.J. (2012), "New turtles (Chelonia) from the late Eocene through Late Miocene of the Panama Canal Basin", Journal of Paleontology, 86 (3): 539–557, Bibcode:2012JPal...86..539C, doi:10.1666/11-106.1
- Rhodin, Anders G.J.; van Dijk, Peter Paul; Iverson, John B.; Shaffer, H. Bradley (2010-12-14). "Turtles of the World 2010 Update: Annotated Checklist of Taxonomy, Synonymy, Distribution and Conservation Status" (PDF). Archived from the original (PDF) on 2011-07-17.
- Fritz, Uwe; Havaš, Peter (2007-10-31). "Checklist of Chelonians of the World" (PDF). Archived from the original (PDF) on 2011-05-01.
