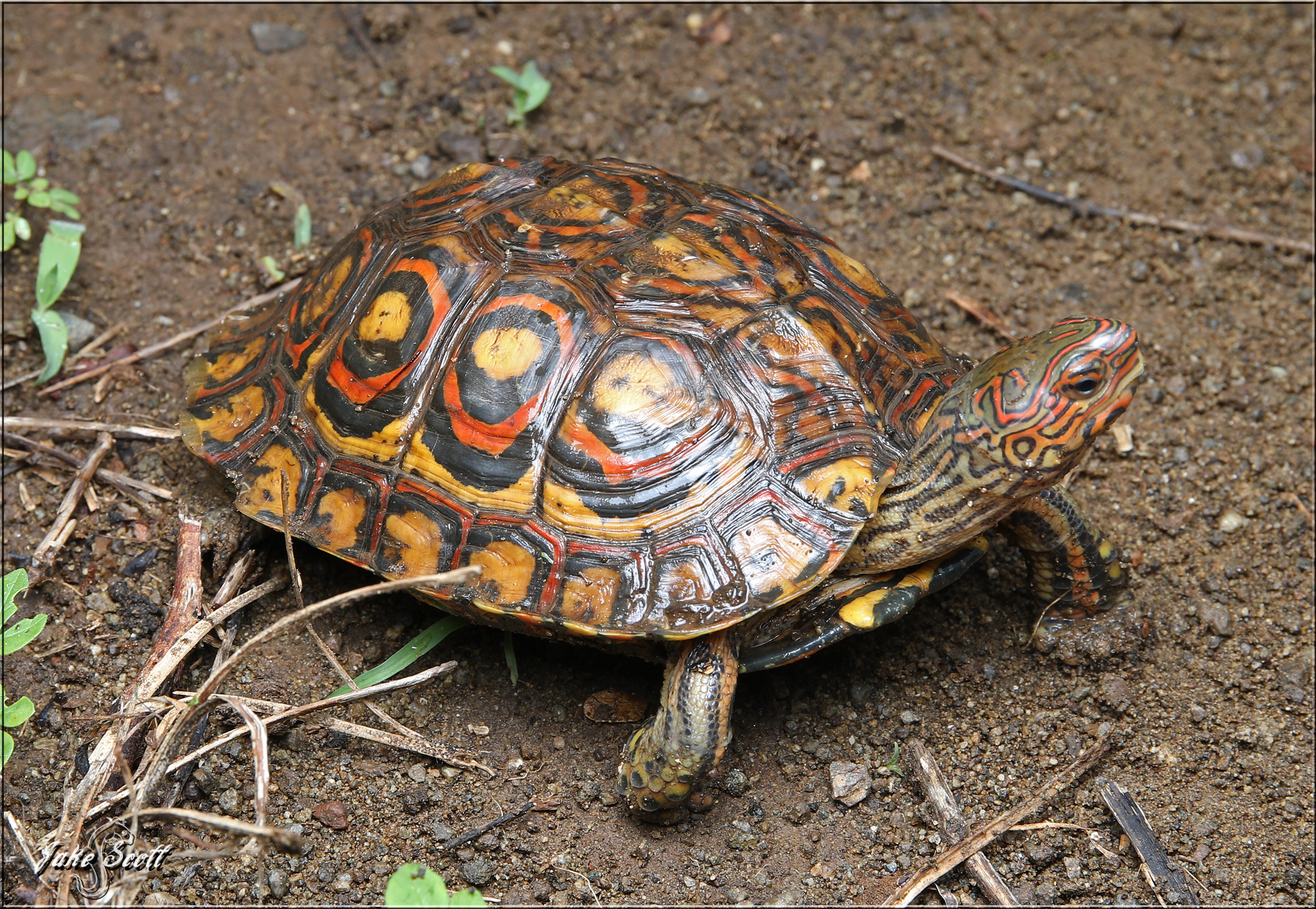

Conservation status
- Near Threatened (IUCN 3.1)

Scientific classification
- Kingdom: Animalia
- Phylum: Chordata
- Order: Testudines
- Suborder: Cryptodira
- Family: Geoemydidae
- Genus: Rhinoclemmys
- Species: R. pulcherrima

Binomial name
- Rhinoclemmys pulcherrima (Gray, 1855)

Synonyms
- Rhinoclemmys pulcherrima pulcherrima: Emys pulcherrimus Gray, 1856; Clemmys pulcherrima Strauch, 1862; Callichelys pulcherrima Gray, 1863; Emys pulcherrima Müller, 1865; Rhinoclemmys pulcherrima Gray, 1873; Chelopus pulcherrima Bocourt, 1876; Pseudemys pulcherrima Garman, 1884; Chelopus pulcherrimus Cope, 1887; Nicoria punctularia var. pulcherrima Boulenger, 1889; Geoemyda punctularia pulcherrima Siebenrock, 1909; Geoemyda pulcherrima pulcherrima Wettstein, 1934; Rhinoclemys pulcherrima McDowell, 1964; Rhinoclemmys pulcherrima pulcherrima Smith & Taylor, 1966; Rhinoclemmys pulcherrina Fairchild, Kohls & Tipton, 1966 (ex errore); Rhinoclemys pulcherrima pulcherrima Greene, 1972; Callopsis pulcherrima pulcherrima Smith & Smith, 1975; Rhinoclemmys pulcherria Acuña-Mesén, 2006 (ex errore); Rhinoclemmys pulcherrima incisa: Emys incisa Bocourt, 1868; Rhinoclemmys frontalis Gray, 1873; Rhinoclemmys bocourti Gray, 1873; Chelopus incisa Bocourt, 1876; Chelopus incisus Sumichrast, 1880; Glyptemys incisa Garman, 1884; Nicoria punctularia var. incisa Boulenger, 1889; Clemmys incisa Strauch, 1890; Chrysemys incisa Gadow, 1905; Geoemyda punctularia incisa Siebenrock, 1909; Rhinoclemmys incisa Schmidt, 1928; Geoemyda pulcherrima incisa Wettstein, 1934; Rhinoclemmys pulcherrima incisa Smith & Taylor, 1966; Callopsis pulcherrima incisa Smith & Smith, 1975; Rhinoclemmys pulcherrima insica Rogner, 1995 (ex errore); Rhinoclemmys pulcherrima manni: Geoemyda manni Dunn, 1930; Geoemyda pulcherrima manni Wettstein, 1934; Geoemyda punctularia manni Mertens, Müller & Rust, 1934; Callopsis pulcherrima manni Smith, Smith & Sawin, 1976; Rhinoclemmys pulcherrima manni Pritchard, 1979; Rhinoclemys pulcherrima manni Pritchard, 1979; Rhinoclemmys pulcherrima rogerbarbouri: Callopsis pulcherrima rogerbarbouri Ernst, 1978; Rhinoclemmys pulcherrima rogerbarbouri Pritchard, 1979; Rhinoclemys pulcherrima rogerbarbouri Pritchard, 1979

= Painted wood turtle =

Species of turtle

The ornate or painted wood turtle (Rhinoclemmys pulcherrima) is one of nine turtle species of the genus Rhinoclemmys of the family Geoemydidae. There are four recognized subspecies.

== Description ==
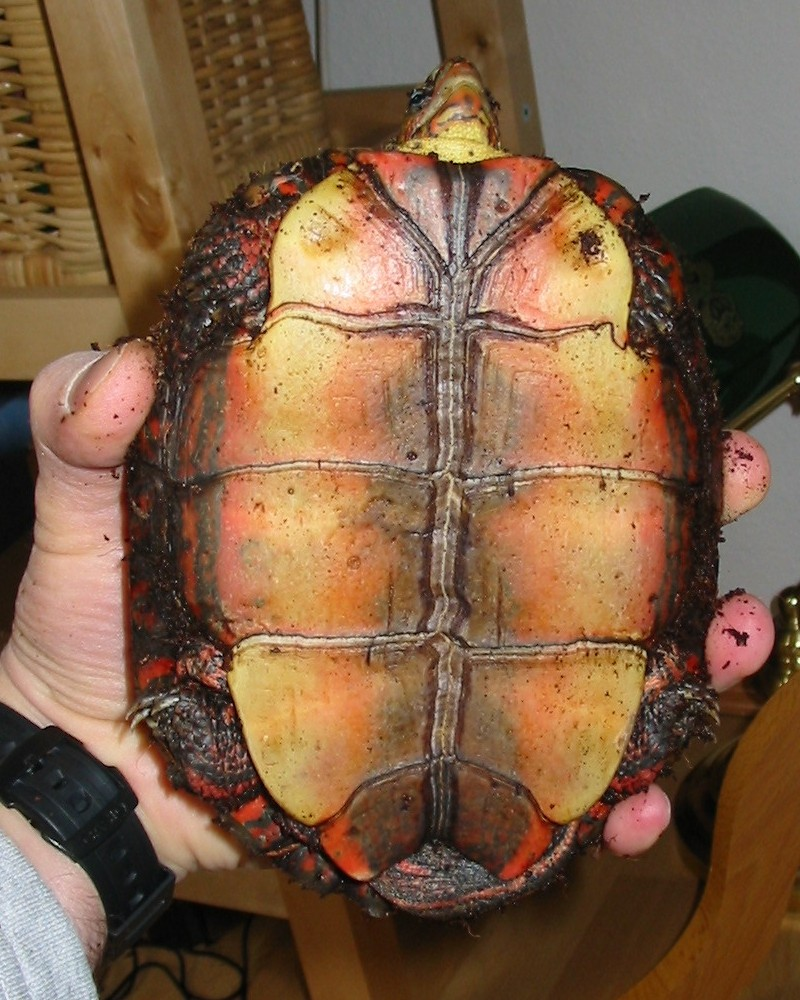
Plastron of a painted wood turtle

Painted wood turtles can grow to a maximum length of 20cm. It has a dome-shaped carapace and the plastron has a continuous ventral line. It has red stripes on its body and it has webbed feet.

== Distribution ==
It is found in Mexico (from Sonora southwards) and Central America, as far south as Costa Rica and Panama.

== Habitat ==
Painted wood turtles live in rainforests, shallow rivers and bushes. Although they are mostly terrestrial, they can occasionally be found in shallow water.

== Diet ==
The painted wood turtle feeds on fruit, insects, and worms. Their diet should consist of 60% leafy greens, 30% protein, and 20% fruits and vegetables. Along with a varied diet, they require additional calcium to insure healthy shell growth. Unlike aquatic turtles, the painted wood turtle doesn't require water in order to swallow its food.

== Breeding ==
Painted wood turtles are oviparous. Females lay 3-5 eggs at a time. Eggs at low temperatures can be dormant early stages, and can sleep for some time at low temperatures, when the temperature returns to normal incubation can proceed.

== In captivity ==
Painted wood turtles can be kept as pets, and it has long been imported into the various parts of Asia, such as Japan, Taiwan and China. The nominate subspecies is the most common subspecies kept in captivity. They will eat commercial turtle food, and will also eat plant matter.

== Subspecies ==
- Rhinoclemmys pulcherrima incisa - Honduras wood turtle - El Salvador, Guatemala, Nicaragua, Honduras and southern Mexico
- Rhinoclemmys pulcherrima pulcherrima - nominate race - southern Nicaragua, Costa Rica
- Rhinoclemmys pulcherrima manni - Central American wood turtle - Mexico, Guerrero and Oaxaca
- Rhinoclemmys pulcherrima rogerbarbouri - Mexican wood turtle - Mexican endemic subspecies
