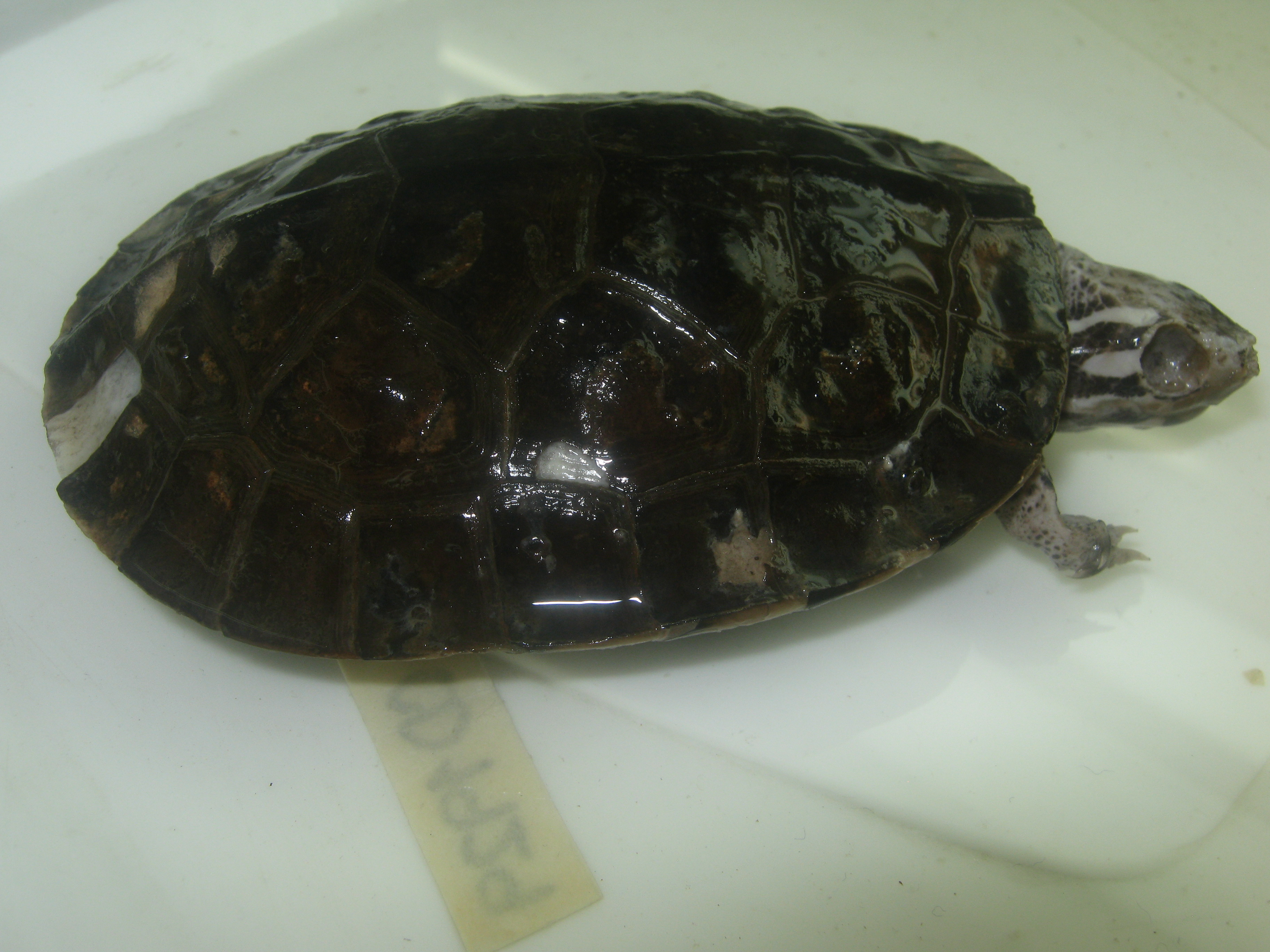

Conservation status
- Vulnerable (IUCN 3.1)

Scientific classification
- Kingdom: Animalia
- Phylum: Chordata
- Class: Reptilia
- Order: Testudines
- Suborder: Cryptodira
- Family: Geoemydidae
- Genus: Rhinoclemmys
- Species: R. nasuta

Binomial name
- Rhinoclemmys nasuta (Boulenger, 1902)

Synonyms
- Nicoria nasuta Boulenger, 1902; Geoemyda nasuta Siebenrock, 1909; Geoemyda punctularia nasuta Mertens, 1954; Callopsis punctularia nasuta Smith, Smith & Sawin, 1976; Rhinoclemmys punctularia nasuta Fretey, Hoogmoed & Lescure, 1977; Callopsis nasuta Ernst, 1978; Rhinoclemmys nasuta Pritchard, 1979; Rhinoclemys nasuta Pritchard, 1979

= Large-nosed wood turtle =

Species of reptile

The large-nosed wood turtle (Rhinoclemmys nasuta) is one of nine species of turtle in the genus Rhinoclemmys of the family Geoemydidae. It is found in Colombia and Ecuador.
