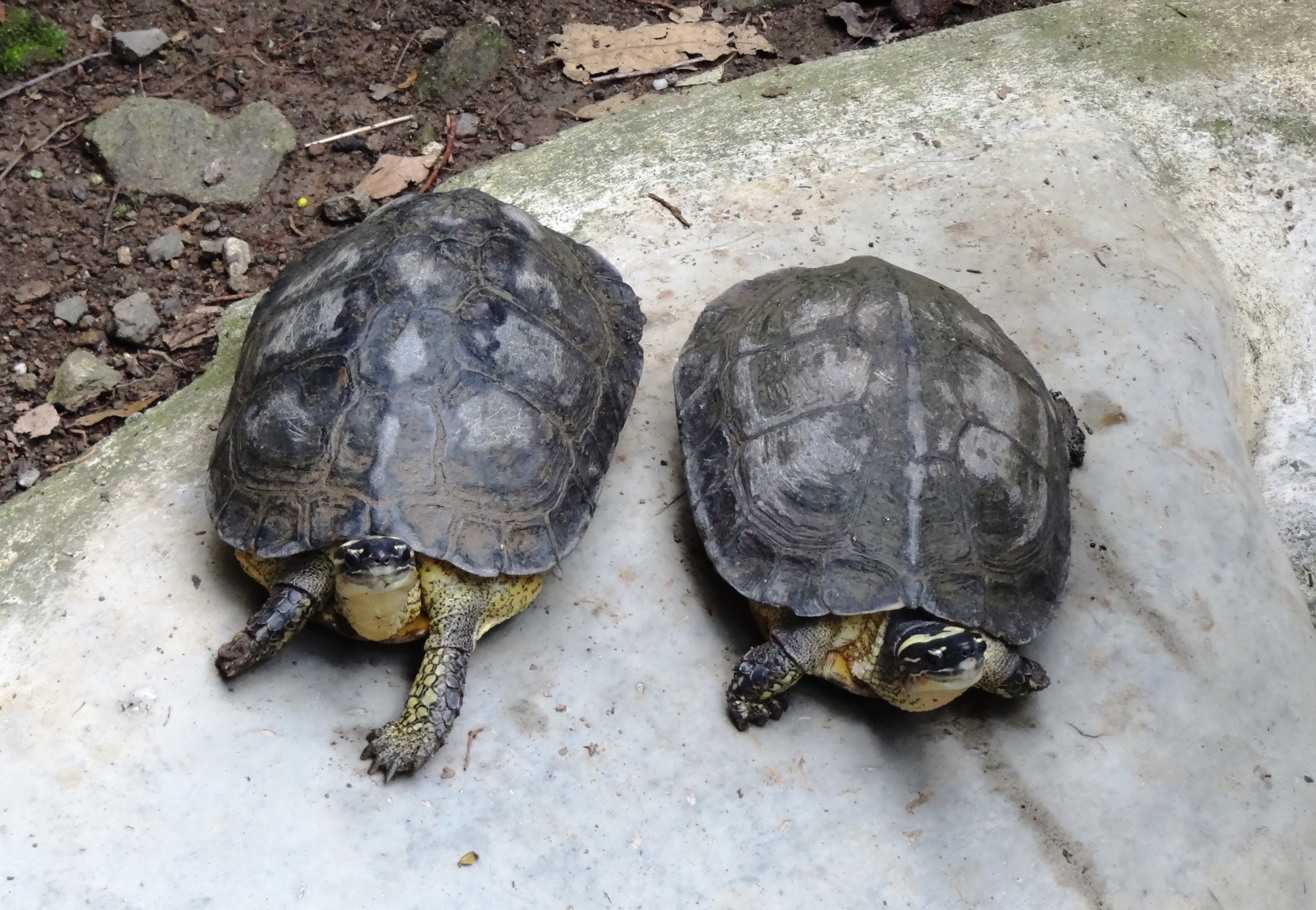

Conservation status
- Least Concern (IUCN 2.3)

Scientific classification
- Domain: Eukaryota
- Kingdom: Animalia
- Phylum: Chordata
- Class: Reptilia
- Order: Testudines
- Suborder: Cryptodira
- Superfamily: Testudinoidea
- Family: Geoemydidae
- Genus: Rhinoclemmys
- Species: R. melanosterna

Binomial name
- Rhinoclemmys melanosterna (Gray, 1961)

Synonyms
- Geoclemmys melanosterna Gray, 1861; Clemmys melanosterna Strauch, 1862; Rhinoclemmys melanosterna Gray, 1863; Nicoria punctularia var. melanosternum Boulenger, 1889; Geoemyda punctularia melanosternum Siebenrock, 1909; Geoemyda punctularia melanosterna Mertens, 1954; Callopsis punctularia melanosterna Smith, Smith & Sawin, 1976; Rhinoclemmys punctularia melanosterna Fretey, Hoogmoed & Lescure, 1977; Rhinoclemys melanosterna Pritchard, 1979

= Colombian wood turtle =

Species of turtle

The Colombian wood turtle (Rhinoclemmys melanosterna) is one of nine species of turtle belonging to the genus Rhinoclemmys of the family Geoemydidae. It is found in Colombia, Ecuador, and Panama.
