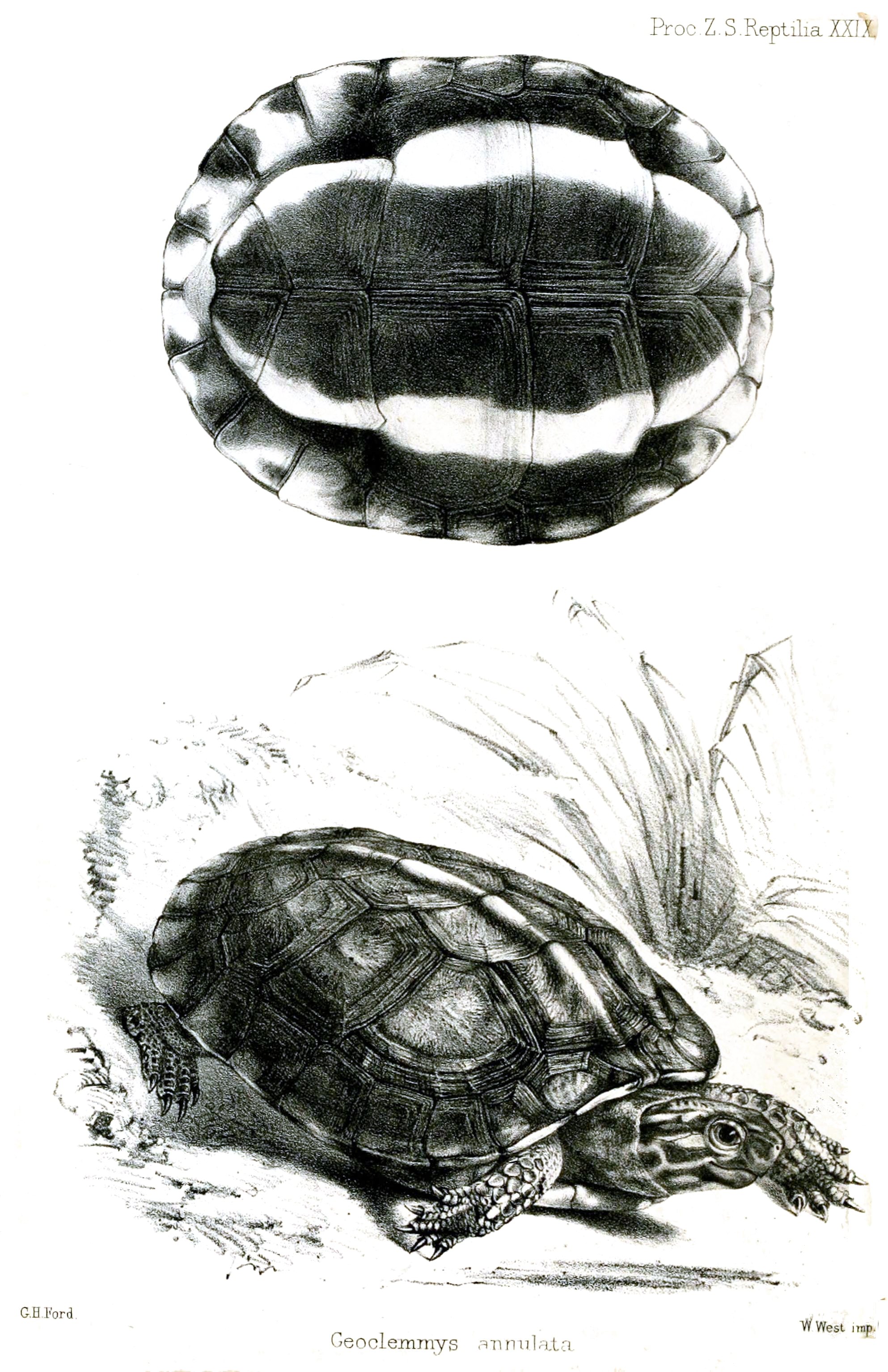
- Illustration of Rhinoclemmys annulata by G.H. Ford from Gray's original description.

Conservation status
- Near Threatened (IUCN 3.1)

Scientific classification
- Kingdom: Animalia
- Phylum: Chordata
- Class: Reptilia
- Order: Testudines
- Suborder: Cryptodira
- Family: Geoemydidae
- Genus: Rhinoclemmys
- Species: R. annulata

Binomial name
- Rhinoclemmys annulata (Gray, 1860)

Synonyms
- Geoclemmys annulata Gray, 1860; Clemmys annulata — Strauch, 1862; Rhinoclemys (Callopsis) annulata — Gray, 1863; Chelopus annulatus — Cope, 1865; Rhinoclemmys annulata — Gray, 1870; Chelopus gabbii Cope, 1876; Emys gabbi [sic] Günther, 1885 (ex errore); Nicoria annulata — Boulenger, 1889; Nicoria gabbii — Boulenger, 1889; Geoemyda annulata — Siebenrock, 1909; Geoemyda gabbii — Siebenrock, 1909; Rhinoclemmys gabbii — Allee, 1926; Geoamyda annulata — Park, Barden & Williams, 1940; Geoemyda annulaia [sic] Medem, 1958 (ex errore); Geoemyda gabbi — Pritchard, 1967; Callopsis annulata — H.M. Smith, R.B. Smith & Sawin, 1976; Rhinoclemmys angulata [sic] Highfield, 1996 (ex errore)

= Brown wood turtle =

Species of turtle

The brown wood turtle or brown land turtle (Rhinoclemmys annulata) is a species of turtle in the family Geoemydidae. The species is endemic to Central America and northern South America.

== Taxonomy ==
R. annulata is one of nine species of turtles in the genus Rhinoclemmys.

== Geographic range ==
R. annulata is found in Colombia, Costa Rica, Ecuador, Honduras, Nicaragua, and Panama.

== Lifestyle ==
Little is known about reproduction and lifestyle. The male drool during the courtship on the female's head. A laying consists of only one or two eggs that are approximately 3.5 by 7 centimeters long. When the young turtles crawl out of the egg, they are already relatively large and have a shield length of approximately 6.3 cm.

The brown tortoise is a herbivore that feeds on parts of plants such as leaves and various seeds. The turtle is day active, with a peak in the morning and also after heavy rainfall there is an increased activity. At night the turtle hides among the leaves, while the water is sought to cool down in the heat.
