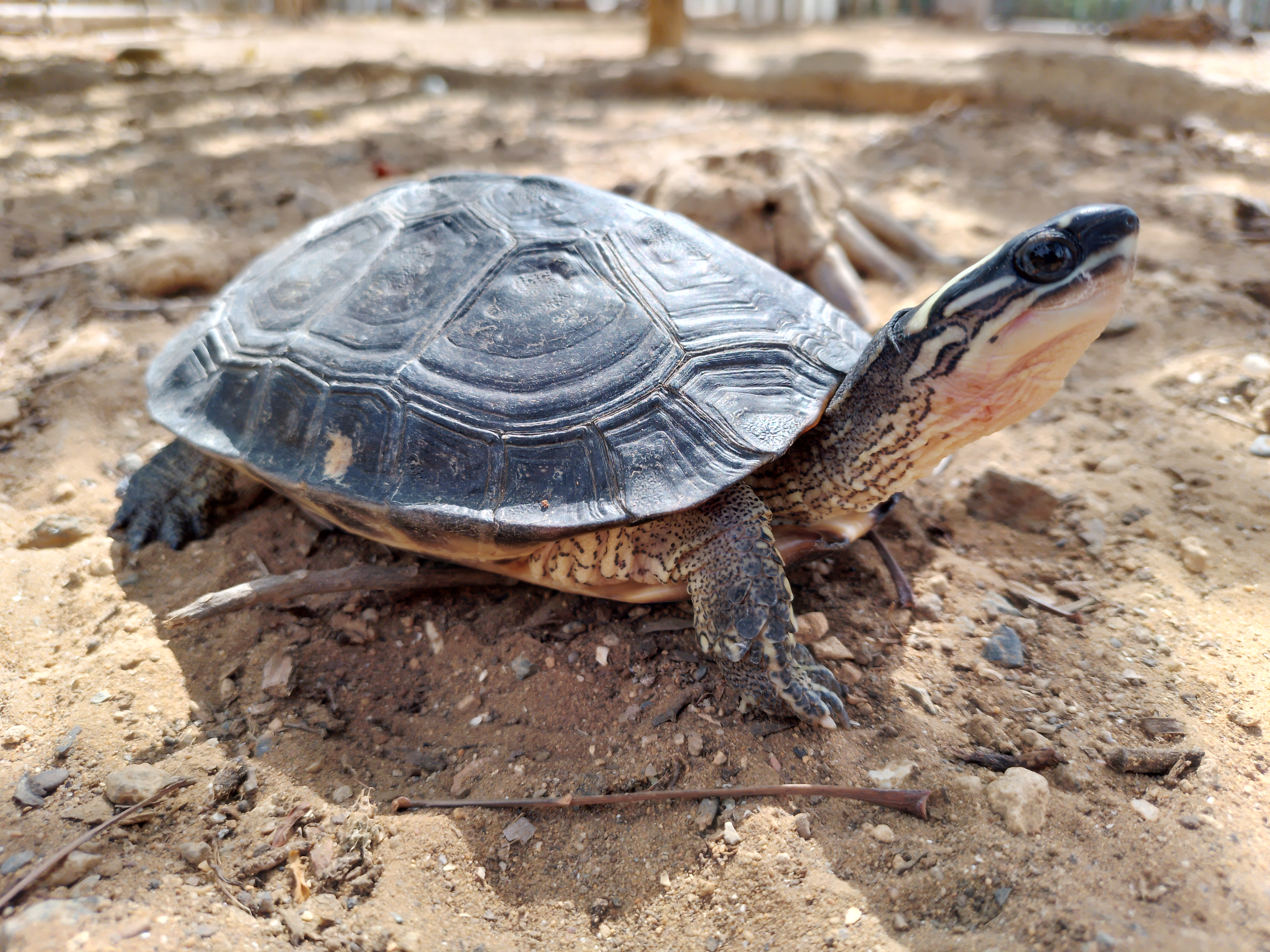

Conservation status
- Endangered (IUCN 2.3)

Scientific classification
- Kingdom: Animalia
- Phylum: Chordata
- Class: Reptilia
- Order: Testudines
- Suborder: Cryptodira
- Family: Geoemydidae
- Genus: Rhinoclemmys
- Species: R. diademata

Binomial name
- Rhinoclemmys diademata (Mertens, 1954)

Synonyms
- Geoemyda punctularia diademata Mertens, 1954; Callopsis punctularia diademata — H.M. Smith, R.B. Smith & Sawin, 1976; Rhinoclemmys punctularia diademata — Fretey, Hoogmoed & Lescure, 1977; Geomyda punctularia diademata — Ernst, 1978; Rhinoclemmys diademata — Pritchard, 1979; Rhinoclemys [sic] diademata — Pritchard, 1979

= Maracaibo wood turtle =

Species of turtle

The Maracaibo wood turtle (Rhinoclemmys diademata) is a species of turtles in the family Geoemydidae. The species is endemic to northern South America.

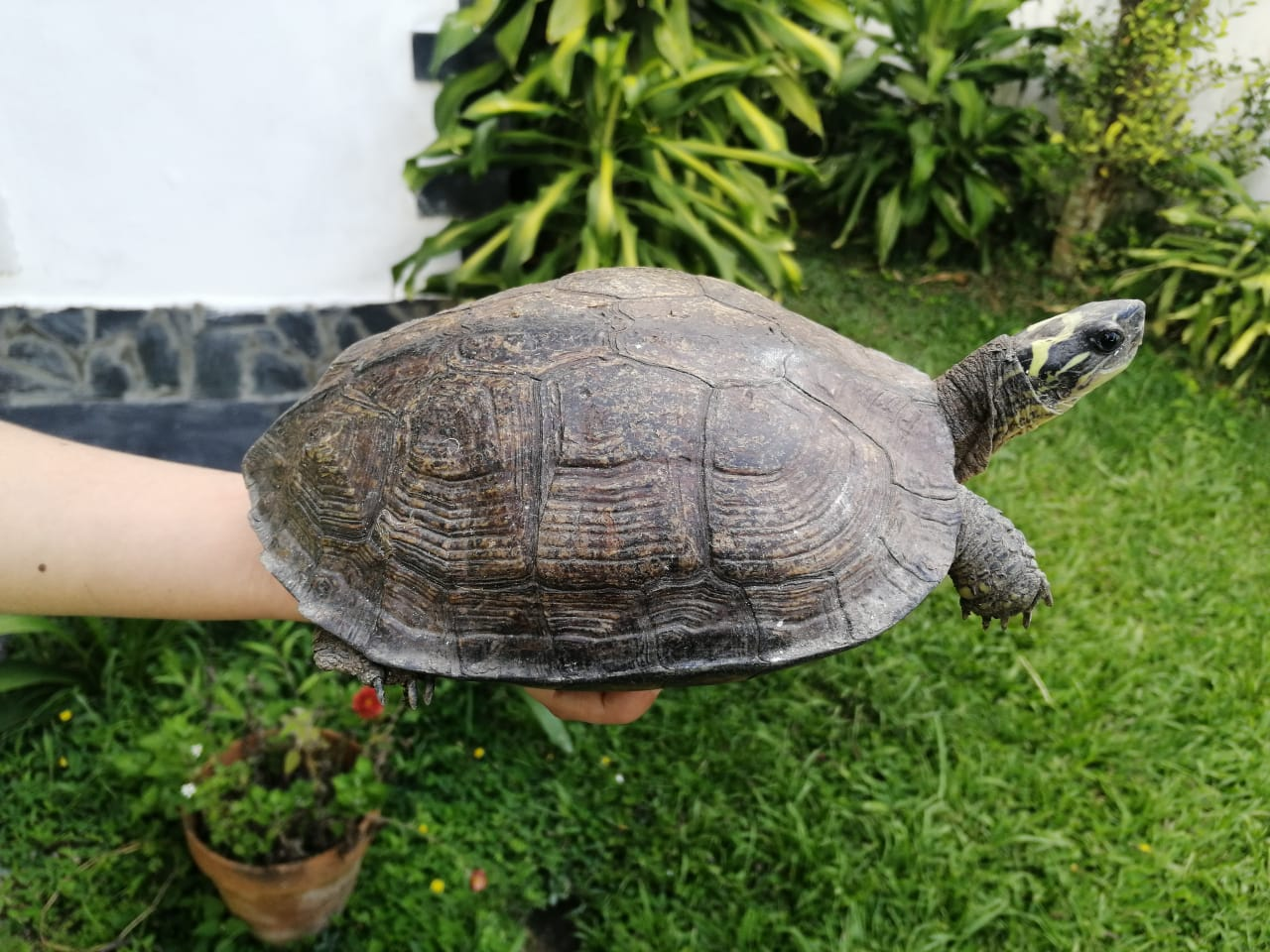

== Geographic range ==
R. diademata is found in Colombia and Venezuela.

== Bibliography ==
- Rhodin, Anders G.J.; van Dijk, Peter Paul; Iverson, John B.; Shaffer, H. Bradley (14 December 2010). "Turtles of the World 2010 Update: Annotated Checklist of Taxonomy, Synonymy, Distribution and Conservation Status" (PDF). Archived from the original (PDF) on 17 July 2011.
- Fritz, Uwe; Havaš, Peter (2007). "Checklist of Chelonians of the World". Vertebrate Zoology. 57 (2). At the request of the CITES Nomenclature Committee and the German Agency for Nature Conservation and funded by the Museum für Tierkunde Dresden and the German Federal Ministry of Environment: 149–368. doi:10.3897/vz.57.e30895. ISSN 1864-5755.
