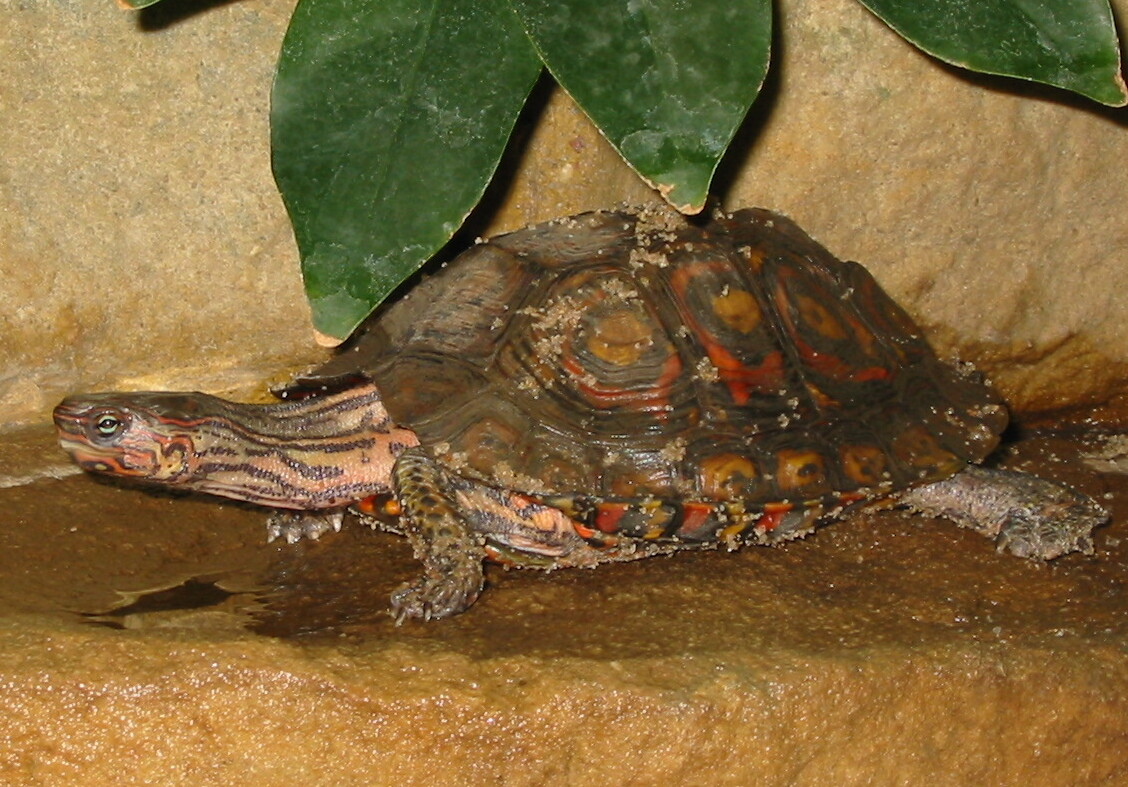
- Ornate wood turtle Rhinoclemmys pulcherrima manni

Scientific classification
- Kingdom: Animalia
- Phylum: Chordata
- Class: Reptilia
- Order: Testudines
- Suborder: Cryptodira
- Superfamily: Testudinoidea
- Family: Geoemydidae; Theobald, 1868

Synonyms
- Geoemydidae Theobald 1868:9; Batagurina Gray 1869:185; Bataguridae Gray 1870:17

= Geoemydidae =

Geoemydidae Temporal range: Late Cretaceous - Present

Family of turtles

The Geoemydidae (formerly known as Bataguridae) are one of the largest and most diverse families in the order Testudines (turtles), with about 70 species. The family includes the Eurasian pond and river turtles and Neotropical wood turtles.

== Characteristics ==
Geoemydidae are turtles of various sizes (from about 10 to 80 cm (4 to 30 in) in length) with often a high degree of sexual dimorphism. They usually have webbed toes, and their pelvic girdles articulate with their plastrons flexibly. Their necks are drawn back vertically. Their carapaces have 24 marginal scutes. The plastron is composed of 12 scutes and has no mesoplastron; the pectoral and abdominal scutes contact the marginal scutes.

Some other features include a single articulation between the fifth and sixth cervical vertebrae, the lack of a hyomandibular branch of the facial nerve, and an epipterygoid bone in the skull.

== Ecology ==
Geoemydidae live in tropics and subtropics of Asia, Europe and North Africa; the only genus in Central and South America is Rhinoclemmys. Their habitats include freshwater ecosystems, coastal marine areas, and tropical forests. Most are herbivorous, but some are omnivorous or carnivorous species. In mating, the males are usually much more active than females. A relatively small number of eggs per clutch is common, produced several times a year. Some species have a temperature-dependent sex determination system, while others possess different sex chromosomes; one known species (Siebenrockiella crassicolis) exhibits XX/XY sex determination, while another species (Pangshura smithii) exhibits ZZ/ZW sex determination.

About 70% of the extant species have been reported to be in endangered or vulnerable condition.

== Systematics and evolution ==
Traditional systematics placed the geoemydids in the family Emydidae as the subfamily Batagurinae. In the 1980s, the subfamily was elevated to the family status and renamed to Geoemydidae according to the ICZN rules.

Most fossil and molecular data support their close relationship to the family Testudinidae.

The intrafamilial taxonomy is not well established yet, due to the large number and diversity of species. The family is usually divided into two subfamilies and 19 genera. Several species are known to give viable hybrids, which makes the systematics even more complicated.

=== Subfamilies and genera ===
The following genera are classified under Geoemydidae.

- Family Geoemydidae
  - Genus †Banhxeochelys
  - Genus †Duboisemys
  - Subfamily Geoemydinae
    - Genus Batagur (six species, including part of Kachuga)
    - Genus Cuora, Asian box turtle (10 species) (including Cistoclemmys)
    - Genus Cyclemys (seven species)
    - Genus Geoclemys (monotypic genus)
    - Genus Geoemyda (two species)
    - Genus Hardella (monotypic genus)
    - Genus Heosemys (formerly in Geoemyda)
    - Genus Leucocephalon (formerly in Geoemyda and Heosemys)
    - Genus Malayemys (three species)
    - Genus Mauremys, pond turtles (including Annamemys, Cathaiemys and Emmenia)
    - Genus Melanochelys (two species)
    - Genus Morenia (two species)
    - Genus Notochelys (monotypic genus)
    - Genus Orlitia (monotypic genus)
    - Genus Pangshura (four species) (formerly in Kachuga)
    - Genus Sacalia, "eyed" turtles
    - Genus Siebenrockiella (two species, one subgenus Panyaenemys, formerly under Heosemys)
    - Genus Vijayachelys, cane turtle (formerly in Geoemyda and Heosemys)
  - Subfamily Rhinoclemmydinae
    - Genus Rhinoclemmys, Neotropical wood turtles

== Conservation ==
As of the early 2013, six species of the family Geoemydidae are on the CITES Appendix I, and 30 more are on the treaty's Appendix II. A joint China-US proposal for a March 2013 CITES participants' conference seeks to add 15 more Geoemydidae species to the convention's Appendix II.
