= List of endangered and protected species of China =

The endangered species of China may include any wildlife species designated for protection by the national government of China or listed as endangered by international organizations such as the Convention on International Trade in Endangered Species of Wild Fauna and Flora (CITES) and the International Union for Conservation of Nature (IUCN).

Endangered & protected species of China
as designated by the government of China, IUCN and CITES

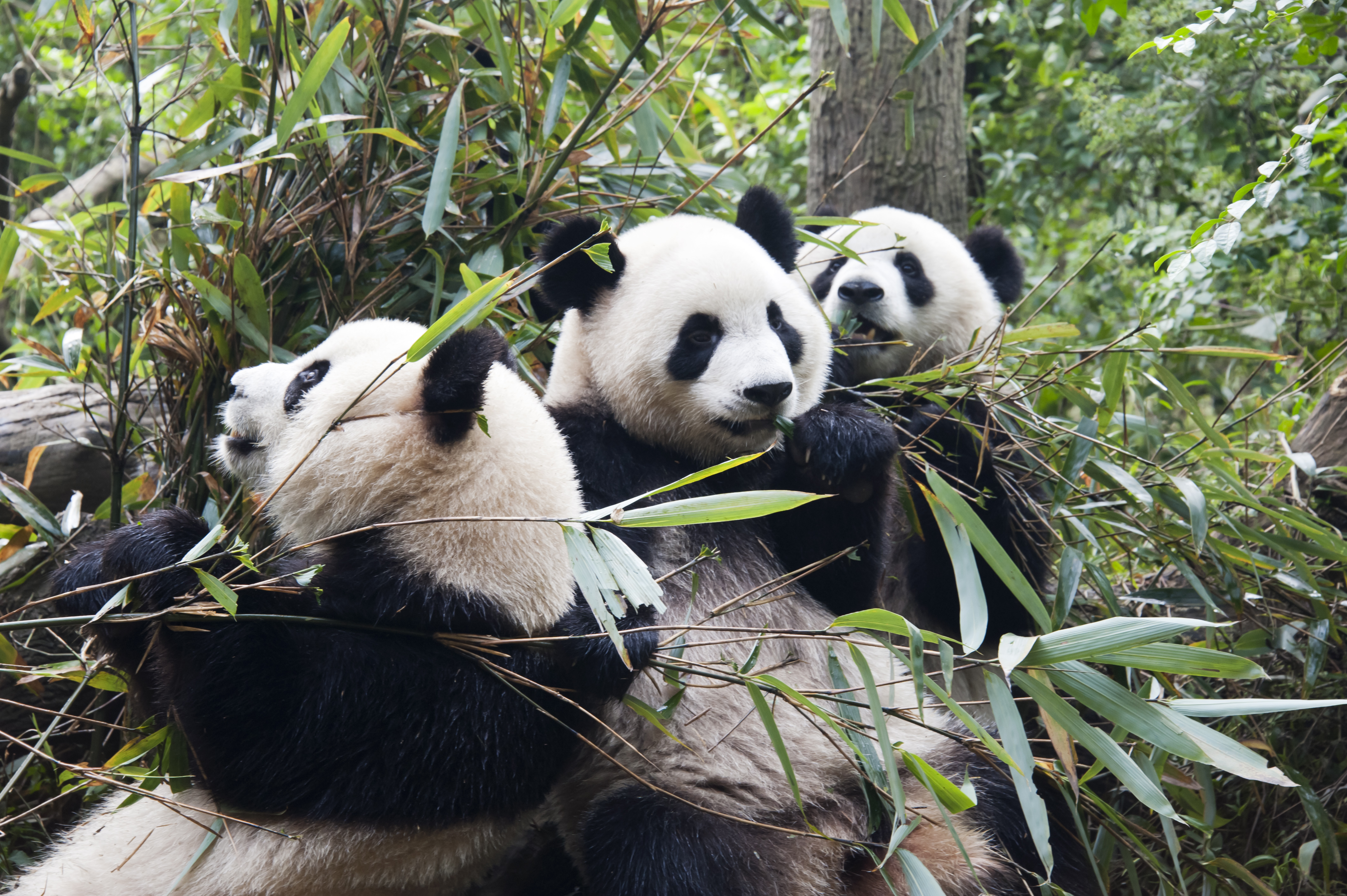
The giant panda (Ailuropoda melanoleuca) is a Class I protected species of the national government of China, a vulnerable species on the IUCN Red List and a species threatened by extinction on Appendix I of the CITES

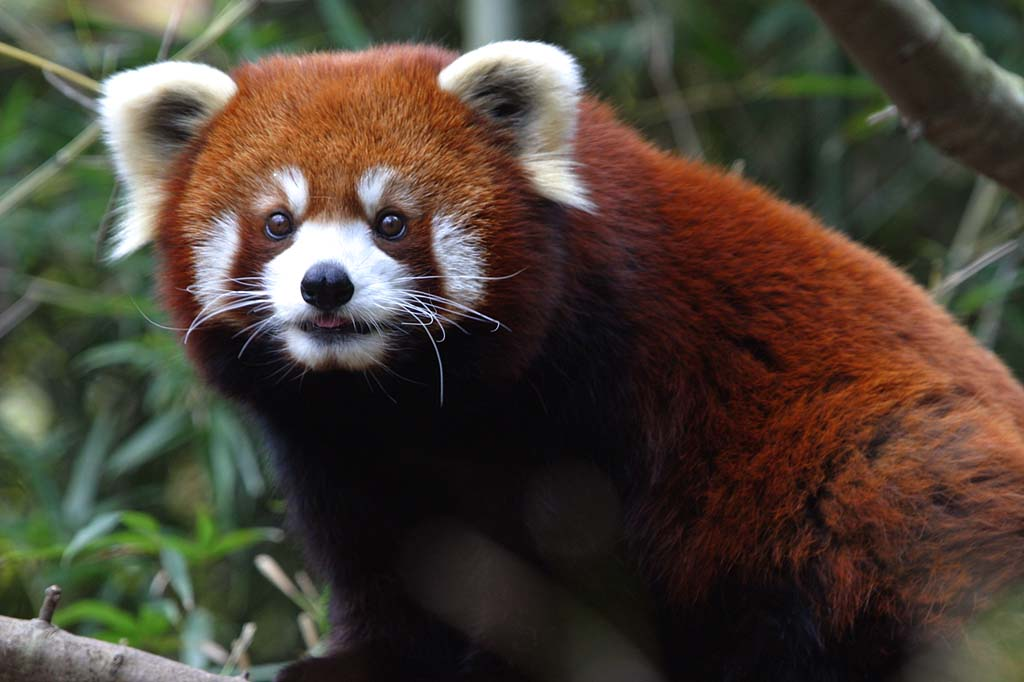
The red panda (Ailurus fulgens) is a Class II species in China, an endangered species on the IUCN Red List and listed in Appendix I of the CITES.

As one of the world's most biodiverse countries and its second most populous, China is home to a significant number of wildlife species vulnerable to or in danger of local extinction due to the impact of human activity. Under the Law of the People's Republic of China on the Protection of Wildlife, the national and local governments are required to designate rare or threatened species for special protection under the law. The type of legal protection that a particular species in China enjoys may depend on the locality of administration. For example, the Beijing Municipal Government designates the wild boar and masked palm civet, which are found in the wilderness around the municipality, as local Class I protected species even though none are among the Class I or II protected species designated by the national government.

China is a signatory country to the CITES and the national government's protected species list generally follows the designation of endangered species by CITES, but also includes certain species that are rare in the country but quite common in other parts of the world so as not to be considered globally threatened (such as moose and beaver) or are vulnerable to economic exploitation thus require legal protection (such as sable and otter). The Chinese endangered species classifications are updated relatively infrequently, and a number of species deemed to be endangered by international bodies have not yet been so recognized in China. Many of the listed species are endemic to the country, such as the groove-toothed flying squirrel and the Ili pika.

== Designation ==
The species listed in this article are designated by one or more of the following authorities as endangered or threatened:

1. The List of Wildlife under Special State Protection as designated by the Chinese State Council pursuant to Article 9 of the Law of the People's Republic of China on the Protection of Wildlife
2. The Convention on International Trade in Endangered Species of Wild Fauna and Flora (CITES), in Appendix I of its catalogue includes "species threatened with extinction".
3. The Red List of Threatened Species compiled by the International Union for Conservation of Nature.

== Endangered and protected animal species ==
=== Mammals ===
Protected and endangered mammal species of China
indicates species endemic to China

Order	Family	Scientific name	Common name	Chinese name	Protection class in China	IUCN Red List	CITES App'x
Primates	Lorisidae	Nycticebus bengalensis	Bengal slow loris	蜂猴	I	Endangered species	I
Primates	Lorisidae	Nycticebus pygmaeus	Pygmy slow loris	倭蜂猴	I	Endangered species	I
Primates	Cercopithecidae	Macaca arctoides	Stump-tailed macaque	短尾猴	II	Vulnerable species	
Primates	Cercopithecidae	Macaca assamensis	Assam macaque	熊猴	II	Near threatened	
Primates	Cercopithecidae	Macaca cyclopis	Formosan rock macaque	台湾猴	I	Least concern	
Primates	Cercopithecidae	Macaca leonina	Northern pig-tailed macaque	北豚尾猴	I	Vulnerable species	
Primates	Cercopithecidae	Macaca leucogenys	White-cheeked macaque	白颊猕猴	II	Endangered species	
Primates	Cercopithecidae	Macaca mulatta	Rhesus macaque	猕猴	II	Least concern	
Primates	Cercopithecidae	Macaca munzala	Arunachal macaque	藏南猕猴	II	Endangered species	
Primates	Cercopithecidae	Macaca thibetana	Tibetan macaque	藏酋猴	II	Near threatened	
Primates	Cercopithecidae	Semnopithecus schistaceus	Nepal gray langur	喜山长尾叶猴	I	Least concern	I
Primates	Cercopithecidae	Trachypithecus crepusculus	Indochinese grey langur	印支灰叶猴	I	Endangered species	
Primates	Cercopithecidae	Trachypithecus francoisi	François' langur	黑叶猴	I	Endangered species	
Primates	Cercopithecidae	Trachypithecus phayrei	Phayre's leaf monkey	菲氏叶猴	I	Endangered species	
Primates	Cercopithecidae	Trachypithecus pileatus	Capped langur	戴帽叶猴	I	Vulnerable species	I
Primates	Cercopithecidae	Trachypithecus leucocephalus	White-headed langur	白头叶猴	I	Critically endangered	
Primates	Cercopithecidae	Trachypithecus shortridgei	Shortridge's langur	肖氏乌叶猴	I	Endangered species	I
Primates	Cercopithecidae	Rhinopithecus bieti	Black snub-nosed monkey	滇金丝猴	I	Endangered species	I
Primates	Cercopithecidae	Rhinopithecus brelichi	Gray snub-nosed monkey	黔金丝猴	I	Critically endangered	I
Primates	Cercopithecidae	Rhinopithecus roxellana	Golden snub-nosed monkey	川金丝猴	I	Endangered species	I
Primates	Cercopithecidae	Rhinopithecus strykeri	Myanmar snub-nosed monkey	怒江金丝猴	I	Critically endangered	I
Primates	Hylobatidae	Hoolock hoolock	Western hoolock gibbon	西白眉长臂猿	I	Endangered species	I
Primates	Hylobatidae	Hoolock leuconedys	Eastern hoolock gibbon	东白眉长臂猿	I	Vulnerable species	I
Primates	Hylobatidae	Hoolock tianxing	Skywalker hoolock gibbon	高黎贡白眉长臂猿	I	Endangered species	I
Primates	Hylobatidae	Hylobates lar	Lar gibbon	白掌长臂猿	I	Endangered species	I
Primates	Hylobatidae	Nomascus concolor	Black crested gibbon	西黑冠长臂猿	I	Critically endangered	I
Primates	Hylobatidae	Nomascus nasutus	Eastern black crested gibbon	东黑冠长臂猿	I	Critically endangered	I
Primates	Hylobatidae	Nomascus hainanus	Hainan black crested gibbon	海南长臂猿	I	Critically endangered	I
Primates	Hylobatidae	Nomascus leucogenys	Northern white-cheeked gibbon	北白颊长臂猿	I	Critically endangered	I
Pholidota	Manidae	Manis crassicaudata	Indian pangolin	印度穿山甲	I	Endangered species	I
Pholidota	Manidae	Manis javanica	Sunda pangolin	马来穿山甲	I	Critically endangered	I
Pholidota	Manidae	Manis pentadactyla	Chinese pangolin	穿山甲	I	Critically endangered	I
Carnivora	Canidae	Canis lupus	Gray wolf	狼	II	Least concern	II
Carnivora	Canidae	Canis aureus	Golden jackel	亚洲胡狼	II	Least concern	
Carnivora	Canidae	Cuon alpinus	Dhole	豺	I	Endangered species	II
Carnivora	Canidae	Nyctereutes procyonoides	Common raccoon dog	貉	II (wildlife)	Least concern	
Carnivora	Canidae	Vulpes corsac	Corsac fox	沙狐	II	Least concern	
Carnivora	Canidae	Vulpes ferrilata	Tibetan fox	藏狐	II	Least concern	
Carnivora	Canidae	Vulpes vulpes	Red fox	赤狐	II	Least concern	
Carnivora	Ursidae	Melursus ursinus	Sloth bear	懒熊	II	Vulnerable species	I
Carnivora	Ursidae	Helarctos malayanus	Sun bear	马来熊	I	Vulnerable species	I
Carnivora	Ursidae	Ursus arctos	Brown bear	棕熊	II	Least concern	I
Carnivora	Ursidae	Ursus thibetanus	Asian black bear	黑熊	II	Vulnerable species	
Carnivora	Ursidae	Ailuropoda melanoleuca	Giant panda	大熊猫	I	Vulnerable species	I
Carnivora	Ailuridae	Ailurus fulgens	Red panda	小熊猫	II	Endangered species	I
Carnivora	Mustelidae	Martes flavigula	Yellow-throated marten	黄喉貂	II	Least concern	
Carnivora	Mustelidae	Martes foina	Beech marten	石貂	II	Least concern	
Carnivora	Mustelidae	Melogale moschata	Chinese ferret-badger	鼬獾	I	Least concern	
Carnivora	Mustelidae	Martes zibellina	Sable	紫貂	I	Least concern	
Carnivora	Mustelidae	Meles leucurus	Asian badger	亚洲狗獾	II	Least concern	
Carnivora	Mustelidae	Gulo gulo	Wolverine	貂熊	I	Least concern	
Carnivora	Mustelidae	Vormela peregusna	Marbled polecat	虎鼬	II	Vulnerable species	
Carnivora	Mustelidae	Aonyx cinerea	Oriental small-clawed otter	小爪水獺	II	Vulnerable species	I
Carnivora	Mustelidae	Lutra lutra	European otter	水獭	II	Near threatened	I
Carnivora	Mustelidae	Enhydra lutris	Sea otter	海獭	II	Endangered species	
Carnivora	Mustelidae	Lutrogale perspicillata	Smooth-coated otter	江獭	II	Vulnerable species	I
Carnivora	Herpestidae	Urva urva	Crab-eating mongoose	食蟹獴	II	Least concern	I
Carnivora	Viverridae	Viverra megaspila	Large-spotted civet	大班灵猫	I	Endangered species	
Carnivora	Viverridae	Viverra zibetha	Large Indian civet	大灵猫	I	Least concern	
Carnivora	Viverridae	Viverricula indica	Small Indian civet	小灵猫	I	Least concern	
Carnivora	Viverridae	Paradoxurus hermaphroditus	Asian palm civet	椰子猫	II	Least concern	
Carnivora	Viverridae	Arctictis binturong	Binturong	熊狸	I	Vulnerable species	
Carnivora	Viverridae	Arctogalidia trivirgata	Small-toothed palm civet	小齿狸	I	Least concern	
Carnivora	Viverridae	Chrotogale owstoni	Owston's palm civet	缟灵猫	I	Endangered species	
Carnivora	Prionodontidae	Prionodon pardicolor	Spotted linsang	斑林狸	II	Least concern	I
Carnivora	Felidae	Felis bieti	Chinese mountain cat	荒漠貓	I	Vulnerable species	II
Carnivora	Felidae	Felis chaus	Jungle cat	丛林猫	I	Least concern	II
Carnivora	Felidae	Felis silvestris	European wildcat	草原斑猫	II	Least concern	II
Carnivora	Felidae	Prionailurus viverrinus	Fishing cat	渔猫	II	Vulnerable species	II
Carnivora	Felidae	Otocolobus manul	Pallas's cat	兔狲	II	Least concern	II
Carnivora	Felidae	Lynx lynx	Eurasian lynx	猞猁	II	Least concern	II
Carnivora	Felidae	Pardofelis marmorata	Marbled cat	云猫	II	Near threatened	I
Carnivora	Felidae	Felis temmincki	Asian golden cat	金猫	I	Near threatened	II
Carnivora	Felidae	Prionailurus bengalensis	Leopard cat	豹猫	II	Least concern	II
Carnivora	Felidae	Neofelis nebulosa	Clouded leopard	云豹	I	Vulnerable species	I
Carnivora	Felidae	Panthera pardus	Leopard	豹	I	Vulnerable species	I
Carnivora	Felidae	Panthera tigris	Tiger	虎	I	Endangered species	I
Carnivora	Felidae	Panthera uncia	Snow leopard	雪豹	I	Vulnerable species	II
Carnivora	Otariidae	Callorhinus ursinus	Northern fur seal	北海狗	II	Vulnerable species	
Carnivora	Otariidae	Eumetopias jubatus	Steller sea lion	北海狮	II	Near threatened	
Carnivora	Phocidae	Phoca largha	Spotted seal	西太平洋斑海豹	I	Least concern	
Carnivora	Phocidae	Erignathus barbatus	Bearded seal	髯海豹	II	Least concern	
Carnivora	Phocidae	Pusa hispida	Ringed seal	环海豹	II	Least concern	
Proboscidea	Elephantidae	Elephas maximus	Asian elephant	亚洲象	I	Endangered species	I
Perissodactyla	Equidae	Equus ferus	Przewalski's horse	普氏野马	I	Endangered species	I
Perissodactyla	Equidae	Equus hemionus	Mongolian wild ass	蒙古野驴	I	Near threatened	I
Perissodactyla	Equidae	Equus kiang	Kiang	藏野驴	I	Least concern	II
Perissodactyla	Rhinocerotidae	Rhinoceros unicornis	Indian rhinoceros	印度犀	l	Vulnerable species	l
Perissodactyla	Rhinocerotidae	Dicerorhinus sumatrensis	Sumatran rhinoceros	苏门答腊犀牛		Critically endangered	I
Perissodactyla	Rhinocerotidae	Rhinoceros sondaicus	Javan rhinoceros	爪哇犀		Critically endangered	I
Artiodactyla	Camelidae	Camelus ferus	Wild Bactrian camel	野骆驼	I	Critically endangered	
Artiodactyla	Tragulidae	Tragulus williamsoni	Williamson's mouse-deer	威氏鼷鹿	I	Data deficient	
Artiodactyla	Moschidae	Moschus anhuiensis	Anhui musk deer	安徽麝	I	Endangered species	II
Artiodactyla	Moschidae	Moschus berezovskii	Dwarf musk deer	林麝	I	Endangered species	II
Artiodactyla	Moschidae	Moschus chrysogaster	Alpine musk deer	马麝	I	Endangered species	II
Artiodactyla	Moschidae	Moschus fuscus	Black musk deer	黑麝	I	Endangered species	II
Artiodactyla	Moschidae	Moschus leucogaster	White-bellied musk deer	喜马拉雅麝	I	Endangered species	II
Artiodactyla	Moschidae	Moschus moschiferus	Siberian musk deer	原麝	I	Vulnerable species	II
Artiodactyla	Cervidae	Hydropotes inermis	Water deer	獐	II	Vulnerable species	
Artiodactyla	Cervidae	Muntiacus crinifrons	Hairy-fronted muntjac	黑麂	I	Vulnerable species	I
Artiodactyla	Cervidae	Muntiacus gongshanensis	Gongshan muntjac	贡山麂	II	Data deficient	
Artiodactyla	Cervidae	Muntiacus muntjak	Southern red muntjac	海南麂	II	Least concern	
Artiodactyla	Cervidae	Axis porcinus	Indian hog deer	豚鹿	I	Endangered species	I (Note: Only applicable to A. p. annamiticus.)
Artiodactyla	Cervidae	Rusa unicolor	Sambar	水鹿	II	Vulnerable species	
Artiodactyla	Cervidae	Cervus nippon	Shika	梅花鹿	I	(Note: While the sika deer (Cervus nippon) is considered by the IUCN to be of least concern globally, at least three subspecies, the Shanxi sika deer (Cervus nippon grassianus), North China sika deer (Cervus nippon mandarinus) and Formosan sika deer (Cervus nippon taioanus) are extinct in the wild in China, but are raised on farms in captivity.)	
Artiodactyla	Cervidae	Cervus canadensis	Elk	马鹿	II	Least concern	
Artiodactyla	Cervidae	Cervus wallichii	Tibetan red deer	西藏马鹿	I	(Note: This subspecies has not been classified by the IUCN Red List; the conservation status shown refers to the species it belongs to.)	
Artiodactyla	Cervidae	Cervus wallichii macneilli	Sichuan deer	白臀鹿	I	Least concern	
Artiodactyla	Cervidae	Cervus yarkandensis	Yarkand deer	塔里木马鹿	I	Least concern	
Artiodactyla	Cervidae	Panolia siamensis	Eld's deer	坡鹿	I	Endangered species	I
Artiodactyla	Cervidae	Przewalskium albirostris	Thorold's deer	白唇鹿	I	Vulnerable species	
Artiodactyla	Cervidae	Elaphurus davidianus	Père David's deer	麋鹿	I	Extinct in the wild	
Artiodactyla	Cervidae	Elaphodus cephalophus	Tufted deer	毛冠鹿	II	Near threatened	
Artiodactyla	Cervidae	Alces alces	Moose	驼鹿	I	Least concern	
Artiodactyla	Bovidae	Bos gaurus	Gaur	野牛	I	Vulnerable species	I
Artiodactyla	Bovidae	Bos javanicus	Banteng	爪哇野牛	I	Critically endangered	
Artiodactyla	Bovidae	Bos mutus	Yak	野牦牛	I	Vulnerable species	I
Artiodactyla	Bovidae	Procapra gutturosa	Mongolian gazelle	蒙原羚	I	Least concern	
Artiodactyla	Bovidae	Procapra picticaudata	Goa	藏原羚	II	Near threatened	
Artiodactyla	Bovidae	Procapra przewalskii	Przewalski's gazelle	普氏原羚	I	Endangered species	
Artiodactyla	Bovidae	Gazella subgutturosa	Goitered gazelle	鹅喉羚	II	Vulnerable species	
Artiodactyla	Bovidae	Pantholops hodgsonii	Tibetan antelope	藏羚	I	Near threatened	I
Artiodactyla	Bovidae	Saiga tatarica	Saiga	高鼻羚羊	I	Critically endangered	II
Artiodactyla	Bovidae	Budorcas bedfordi	Golden takin	秦岭羚牛	I	Vulnerable species	II
Artiodactyla	Bovidae	Budorcas tibetanus	Sichuan takin	四川羚牛	I	Vulnerable species	II
Artiodactyla	Bovidae	Budorcas whitei	Bhutan takin	不丹羚牛	I	Vulnerable species	II
Artiodactyla	Bovidae	Budorcas taxicolor	Mishmi takin	贡山羚牛	I	Vulnerable species	II
Artiodactyla	Bovidae	Naemorhedus baileyi	Red goral	赤斑羚	I	Vulnerable species	I
Artiodactyla	Bovidae	Naemorhedus caudatus	Long-tailed goral	长尾斑羚	II	Vulnerable species	I
Artiodactyla	Bovidae	Naemorhedus evansi	Burmese goral	缅甸斑羚	II	Vulnerable species	I
Artiodactyla	Bovidae	Naemorhedus goral	Himalayan goral	喜马拉雅斑羚	I	Near threatened	I
Artiodactyla	Bovidae	Naemorhedus griseus	Chinese goral	中华斑羚	II	Vulnerable species	I
Artiodactyla	Bovidae	Hemitragus jemlahicus	Himalayan tahr	塔尔羊	I	Near threatened	
Artiodactyla	Bovidae	Capra sibirica	Siberian ibex	北山羊	II	Near threatened	
Artiodactyla	Bovidae	Pseudois nayaur	Bharal	岩羊	II	Least concern	
Artiodactyla	Bovidae	Ovis ammon	Altai argali	阿尔泰盘羊	II	Near threatened	II
Artiodactyla	Bovidae	Ovis collium	Karaganda argali	哈萨克盘羊	II	Near threatened	II
Artiodactyla	Bovidae	Ovis darwini	Gobi argali	戈壁盘羊	II	Near threatened	II
Artiodactyla	Bovidae	Ovis hodgsoni	Tibetan argali	西藏盘羊	I	Near threatened	I
Artiodactyla	Bovidae	Ovis karelini	Tian Shan argali	天山盘羊	II	Near threatened	II
Artiodactyla	Bovidae	Ovis polii	Marco Polo sheep	帕米尔盘羊	II	Near threatened	II
Artiodactyla	Bovidae	Capricornis milneedwardsii	Chinese serow	中华鬣羚	II	Vulnerable species	I
Artiodactyla	Bovidae	Capricornis rubidus	Red serow	红鬣羚	II	Vulnerable species	I
Artiodactyla	Bovidae	Capricornis swinhoei	Taiwan serow	台湾鬣羚	I	Least concern	
Artiodactyla	Bovidae	Capricornis thar	Himalayan serow	喜马拉雅鬣羚	I	Vulnerable species	I
Rodentia	Castoridae	Castor fiber	Eurasian beaver	河狸	I	Least concern	
Rodentia	Hystricidae	Hystrix brachyura	Malayan porcupine	马来豪猪		Least concern	
Rodentia	Spalacidae	Rhizomys sinensis	Chinese bamboo rat	中华竹鼠		Least concern	
Rodentia	Spalacidae	Rhizomys pruinosus	Hoary bamboo rat	银星竹鼠	II	Least concern	II
Rodentia	Sciuridae	Marmota sibirica	Tarbagan marmot	蒙古旱獭		Endangered species	
Rodentia	Sciuridae	Ratufa bicolor	Black giant squirrel	巨松鼠	II	Near threatened	II
Rodentia	Zapodidae	Eozapus setchuanus	Chinese jumping mouse	林跳鼠	II	Least concern	
Rodentia	Dipodidae	Euchoreutes naso	Long-eared jerboa	長耳跳鼠		Least concern	
Rodentia	Sminthidae	Sicista betulina	Northern birch mouse	林蹶鼠	I	Least concern	
Eulipotyphla	Erinaceidae	Neohylomys hainanensis	Hainan gymnure	海南新毛猬		Endangered species	
Lagomorpha	Ochotonidae	Ochotona argentata	Helan Shan pika	贺兰山鼠兔	II	Endangered species	
Lagomorpha	Ochotonidae	Ochotona iliensis	Ili pika	伊犁鼠兔	II	Endangered species	
Lagomorpha	Leporidae	Caprolagus hispidus	Hispid hare	粗毛兔	II	Endangered species	I
Lagomorpha	Leporidae	Lepus hainanus	Hainan hare	海南兔	II	Vulnerable species	
Lagomorpha	Leporidae	Lepus timidus	Mountain hare	雪兔	II	Least concern	
Lagomorpha	Leporidae	Lepus yarkandensis	Yarkand hare	塔里木兔	II	Near threatened	
Sirenia	Dugongidae	Dugong dugon	Dugong	儒艮	I	Vulnerable species	I
Cetacea	Balaenidae	Eubalaena japonica	North Pacific right whale	北太平洋 露脊鲸	I	Endangered species	I
Cetacea	Eschrichtiidae	Eschrichtius robustus	Gray whale	灰鲸	I	Least concern	I
Cetacea	Balaenopteridae	Balaenoptera musculus	Blue whale	蓝鲸	I	Endangered species	I
Cetacea	Balaenopteridae	Balaenoptera acutorostrata	Common minke whale	小须鲸	I	Least concern	I
Cetacea	Balaenopteridae	Balaenoptera borealis	Sei whale	塞鯨	I	Endangered species	I
Cetacea	Balaenopteridae	Balaenoptera edeni	Eden's whale	布氏鲸	I	Least concern	I
Cetacea	Balaenopteridae	Balaenoptera omurai	Omura's whale	大村鲸	I	Data deficient	I
Cetacea	Balaenopteridae	Balaenoptera physalus	Fin whale	长须鲸	I	Endangered species	I
Cetacea	Lipotidae	Lipotes vexillifer	Baiji	白鱀豚	I	Critically endangered	I
Cetacea	Delphinidae	Sousa chinensis	Indo-Pacific humpback dolphin	中华白海豚	I	Vulnerable species	I
Cetacea	Delphinidae	Steno bredanensis	Rough-toothed dolphin	糙齿海豚	II	Least concern	
Cetacea	Delphinidae	Stenella attenuata	Pantropical spotted dolphin	热带点班原海豚	II	Least concern	
Cetacea	Delphinidae	Stenella coeruleoalba	Striped dolphin	条纹原海豚	II	Least concern	
Cetacea	Delphinidae	Stenella longirostris	Spinner dolphin	飞旋原海豚	II	Least concern	
Cetacea	Delphinidae	Delphinus capensis	Long-beaked common dolphin	长喙真海豚	II	Least concern	
Cetacea	Delphinidae	Delphinus delphis	Common dolphin	真海豚	II	Least concern	
Cetacea	Delphinidae	Tursiops aduncus	Indo-Pacific bottlenose dolphin	印太瓶鼻海豚	II	Near threatened	
Cetacea	Delphinidae	Tursiops truncatus	Common bottlenose dolphin	瓶鼻海豚	II	Least concern	
Cetacea	Delphinidae	Lagenodelphis hosei	Fraser's dolphin	弗氏海豚	II	Least concern	
Cetacea	Delphinidae	Grampus griseus	Risso's dolphin	里氏海豚	II	Least concern	
Cetacea	Delphinidae	Lagenorhynchus obliquidens	Pacific white-sided dolphin	太平洋斑纹海豚	II	Least concern	
Cetacea	Delphinidae	Peponocephala electra	Melon-headed whale	瓜头鲸	II	Least concern	
Cetacea	Delphinidae	Orcinus orca	Orca	虎鲸	II	Data deficient	
Cetacea	Delphinidae	Pseudorca crassidens	False killer whale	伪虎鲸	II	Near threatened	
Cetacea	Delphinidae	Feresa attenuata	Pygmy killer whale	小虎鲸	II	Least concern	
Cetacea	Delphinidae	Globicephala macrorhynchus	Short-finned pilot whale	短肢领航鲸	II	Least concern	
Cetacea	Phocoenidae	Neophocaena asiaorientalis	Yangtze finless porpoise	长江江豚	I	Critically endangered	I
Cetacea	Phocoenidae	Neophocaena sunameri	East Asian finless porpoise	东亚江豚	II	Endangered species	
Cetacea	Phocoenidae	Neophocaena phocaenoides	Indo-Pacific finless porpoise	印太江豚	II	Vulnerable species	I
Cetacea	Physeteridae	Physeter macrocephalus	Sperm whale	抹香鲸	I	Vulnerable species	I
Cetacea	Physeteridae	Kogia breviceps	Pygmy sperm whale	小抹香鲸	II	Least concern	
Cetacea	Physeteridae	Kogia sima	Dwarf sperm whale	侏抹香鲸	II	Least concern	
Cetacea	Ziphidae	Ziphius cavirostris	Cuvier's beaked whale	鹅喙鲸	II	Least concern	
Cetacea	Ziphidae	Mesoplodon densirostris	Blainville's beaked whale	柏氏中喙鲸	II	Least concern	
Cetacea	Ziphidae	Mesoplodon ginkgodens	Ginkgo-toothed beaked whale	银杏齿中喙鲸	II	Data deficient	
Cetacea	Ziphidae	Mesoplodon peruvianus	Pygmy beaked whale	小中喙鲸	II	Least concern	
Cetacea	Ziphidae	Berardius bairdii	Baird's beaked whale	贝氏喙鲸	II	Least concern	I
Cetacea	Ziphidae	Indopacetus pacificus	Tropical bottlenose whale	朗氏喙鲸	II	Least concern	

=== Birds ===
Protected and endangered bird species of China
indicates species endemic to China

Order	Family	Scientific name	Common name	Chinese name	Protection class in China	IUCN Red List	CITES App'x
Galliformes	Phasianidae	Arborophila torqueola	Hill partridge	环颈山鹧鸪	II	Least concern	
Galliformes	Phasianidae	Arborophila rufipectus	Sichuan partridge	四川山鹧鸪	I	Vulnerable species	
Galliformes	Phasianidae	Arborophila rufogularis	Rufous-throated partridge	红喉山鹧鸪	II	Least concern	
Galliformes	Phasianidae	Arborophila gingica	White-necklaced partridge	白眉山鹧鸪	II	Near threatened	
Galliformes	Phasianidae	Arborophila atrogularis	White-cheeked partridge	白颊山鹧鸪	II	Least concern	
Galliformes	Phasianidae	Arborophila brunneopectus	Bar-backed partridge	褐胸山鹧鸪	II	Least concern	
Galliformes	Phasianidae	Arborophila mandellii	Chestnut-breasted partridge	红胸山鹧鸪	II	Near threatened	
Galliformes	Phasianidae	Arborophila crudigularis	Taiwan partridge	台湾山鹧鸪	II	Least concern	
Galliformes	Phasianidae	Arborophila ardens	Hainan partridge	海南山鹧鸪	I	Vulnerable species	
Galliformes	Phasianidae	Tropicoperdix chloropus	Green-legged partridge	绿脚树鹧鸪	II	Least concern	
Galliformes	Phasianidae	Tetrastes bonasia	Hazel grouse	花尾榛鸡	II	Least concern	
Galliformes	Phasianidae	Tetrastes sewerzowi	Chinese grouse	斑尾榛鸡	I	Near threatened	
Galliformes	Phasianidae	Falcipennis falcipennis	Siberian grouse	镰翅鸡	II	Least concern	
Galliformes	Phasianidae	Tetrao urogallus	Western capercaillie	松鸡	II	Least concern	
Galliformes	Phasianidae	Tetrao urogalloides	Black-billed capercaillie	黑嘴松鸡	I	Least concern	
Galliformes	Phasianidae	Lyrurus tetrix	Black grouse	黑琴鸡	I	Least concern	
Galliformes	Phasianidae	Lagopus muta	Rock ptarmigan	岩雷鸟	II	Least concern	
Galliformes	Phasianidae	Lagopus lagopus	Willow ptarmigan	柳雷鸟	II	Least concern	
Galliformes	Phasianidae	Tetraophasis obscurus	Chestnut-throated monal-partridge	红喉雉鹑	I	Least concern	
Galliformes	Phasianidae	Tetraophasis szechenyii	Buff-throated monal-partridge	黄喉雉鹑	I	Least concern	
Galliformes	Phasianidae	Tetraogallus himalayensis	Himalayan snowcock	暗腹雪鸡	II	Least concern	
Galliformes	Phasianidae	Tetraogallus tibetanus	Tibetan snowcock	藏雪鸡	II	Least concern	I
Galliformes	Phasianidae	Tetraogallus altaicus	Altai snowcock	阿尔泰雪鸡	II	Least concern	
Galliformes	Phasianidae	Alectoris magna	Przevalski's partridge	大石鸡	II	Least concern	
Galliformes	Phasianidae	Ithaginis cruentus	Blood pheasant	血雉	II	Least concern	II
Galliformes	Phasianidae	Tragopan melanocephalus	Western tragopan	黑头角雉	I	Vulnerable species	I
Galliformes	Phasianidae	Tragopan satyra	Satyr tragopan	红胸角雉	I	Least concern	
Galliformes	Phasianidae	Tragopan blythii	Blyth's tragopan	灰腹角雉	I	Vulnerable species	I
Galliformes	Phasianidae	Tragopan temminckii	Temminck's tragopan	红腹角雉	II	Least concern	
Galliformes	Phasianidae	Tragopan caboti	Cabot's tragopan	黄腹角雉	I	Vulnerable species	I
Galliformes	Phasianidae	Pucrasia macrolopha	Koklass pheasant	勺鸡	II	Least concern	
Galliformes	Phasianidae	Lophophorus impejanus	Himalayan monal	棕尾虹雉	I	Least concern	I
Galliformes	Phasianidae	Lophophorus sclateri	Sclater's monal	白尾梢虹雉	I	Least concern	I
Galliformes	Phasianidae	Lophophorus lhuysii	Chinese monal	绿尾虹雉	I	Vulnerable species	I
Galliformes	Phasianidae	Gallus gallus	Red junglefowl	红原鸡	II	Least concern	
Galliformes	Phasianidae	Lophura leucomelanos	Kalij pheasant	黑鹇	II	Least concern	
Galliformes	Phasianidae	Lophura nycthemera	Silver pheasant	白鹇	II	Least concern	
Galliformes	Phasianidae	Lophura swinhoii	Swinhoe's pheasant	蓝腹鹇	I	Near threatened	I
Galliformes	Phasianidae	Crossoptilon crossoptilon	White eared pheasant	白马鸡	II	Least concern	I
Galliformes	Phasianidae	Crossoptilon harmani	Tibetan eared pheasant	藏马鸡	II	Least concern	I
Galliformes	Phasianidae	Crossoptilon mantchuricum	Brown eared pheasant	褐马鸡	I	Least concern	I
Galliformes	Phasianidae	Crossoptilon auritum	Blue eared pheasant	蓝马鸡	II	Least concern	
Galliformes	Phasianidae	Syrmaticus ellioti	Elliot's pheasant	白颈长尾雉	I	Least concern	I
Galliformes	Phasianidae	Syrmaticus humiae	Mrs. Hume's pheasant	黑颈长尾雉	I	Vulnerable species	I
Galliformes	Phasianidae	Syrmaticus mikado	Mikado pheasant	黑长尾雉	I	Least concern	I
Galliformes	Phasianidae	Syrmaticus reevesii	Reeves's pheasant	白冠长尾雉	I	Vulnerable species	II
Galliformes	Phasianidae	Chrysolophus pictus	Golden pheasant	红腹锦鸡	II	Least concern	
Galliformes	Phasianidae	Chrysolophus amherstiae	Lady Amherst's pheasant	白腹锦鸡	II	Least concern	
Galliformes	Phasianidae	Polyplectron bicalcaratum	Grey peacock-pheasant	灰孔雀雉	I	Least concern	II
Galliformes	Phasianidae	Polyplectron katsumatae	Hainan peacock-pheasant	海南孔雀雉	I	Endangered species	II
Galliformes	Phasianidae	Pavo muticus	Green peafowl	绿孔雀	I	Endangered species	II
Anseriformes	Anatidae	Dendrocygna javanica	Lesser whistling duck	栗树鸭	II	Least concern	
Anseriformes	Anatidae	Anser cygnoid	Swan goose	鸿雁	II	Endangered species	
Anseriformes	Anatidae	Anser albifrons	Greater white-fronted goose	白额雁	II	Least concern	
Anseriformes	Anatidae	Anser erythropus	Lesser white-fronted goose	小白额雁	II	Vulnerable species	
Anseriformes	Anatidae	Branta ruficollis	Red-breasted goose	红胸黑雁	II	Vulnerable species	II
Anseriformes	Anatidae	Cygnus olor	Mute swan	疣鼻天鹅	II	Least concern	
Anseriformes	Anatidae	Cygnus columbianus	Tundra swan	小天鹅	II	Least concern	
Anseriformes	Anatidae	Cygnus cygnus	Whooper swan	大天鹅	II	Least concern	
Anseriformes	Anatidae	Aix galericulata	Mandarin duck	鸳鸯	II	Least concern	
Anseriformes	Anatidae	Nettapus coromandelianus	Cotton pygmy goose	棉凫	II	Least concern	
Anseriformes	Anatidae	Sibirionetta formosa	Baikal teal	花脸鸭	II	Least concern	
Anseriformes	Anatidae	Marmaronetta angustirostris	Marbled duck	云石斑鸭	II	Near threatened	
Anseriformes	Anatidae	Aythya baeri	Baer's pochard	青头潜鸭	I	Critically Endangered	
Anseriformes	Anatidae	Mergellus albellus	Smew	班头秋沙鸭	II	Least concern	
Anseriformes	Anatidae	Mergus squamatus	Scaly-sided merganser	中华秋沙鸭	I	Endangered species	
Anseriformes	Anatidae	Oxyura leucocephala	White-headed duck	白头硬尾鸭	I	Endangered species	II
Anseriformes	Anatidae	Asarcornis scutulata	White-winged duck	白翅栖鸭	II	Critically endangered	I
Podicipediformes	Podicipedidae	Podiceps grisegena	Red-necked grebe	赤颈䴙䴘	II	Least concern	
Podicipediformes	Podicipedidae	Podiceps auritus	Horned grebe	角䴙䴘	II	Vulnerable species	
Podicipediformes	Podicipedidae	Podiceps nigricollis	Black-necked grebe	黑颈䴙䴘	II	Least concern	
Columbiformes	Columbidae	Columba eversmanni	Yellow-eyed pigeon	中亚鸽	II	Vulnerable species	
Columbiformes	Columbidae	Columba palumbus	Common wood pigeon	斑尾林鸽	II	Least concern	
Columbiformes	Columbidae	Columba punicea	Pale-capped pigeon	紫林鸽	II	Vulnerable species	
Columbiformes	Columbidae	Macropygia unchall	Barred cuckoo-dove	斑尾鹃鸠	II	Least concern	
Columbiformes	Columbidae	Macropygia tenuirostris	Philippine cuckoo-dove	菲律宾鹃鸠	II	Least concern	
Columbiformes	Columbidae	Macropygia ruficeps	Little cuckoo-dove	小鹃鸠	I	Least concern	
Columbiformes	Columbidae	Treron bicinctus	Orange-breasted green pigeon	橙胸绿鸠	II	Least concern	
Columbiformes	Columbidae	Treron pompadora	Sri Lanka green pigeon	灰头绿鸠	II	Least concern	
Columbiformes	Columbidae	Treron curvirostra	Thick-billed green pigeon	厚嘴绿鸠	II	Least concern	
Columbiformes	Columbidae	Treron phoenicopterus	Yellow-footed green pigeon	黄脚绿鸠	II	Least concern	
Columbiformes	Columbidae	Treron apicauda	Pin-tailed green pigeon	针尾绿鸠	II	Least concern	
Columbiformes	Columbidae	Treron sphenurus	Wedge-tailed green pigeon	楔尾绿鸠	II	Least concern	
Columbiformes	Columbidae	Treron sieboldii	White-bellied green pigeon	红翅绿鸠	II	Least concern	
Columbiformes	Columbidae	Treron formosae	Taiwan green pigeon	红顶绿鸠	II	Near threatened	
Columbiformes	Columbidae	Ptilinopus leclancheri	Black-chinned fruit dove	黑颏果鸠	II	Least concern	
Columbiformes	Columbidae	Ducula aenea	Green imperial pigeon	绿皇鸠	II	Near threatened	
Columbiformes	Columbidae	Ducula badia	Mountain imperial pigeon	山皇鸠	II	Least concern	
Pterocliformes	Pteroclidae	Pterocles orientalis	Black-bellied sandgrouse	黑腹沙鸡	II	Least concern	
Caprimulgiformes	Podargidae	Batrachostomus hodgsoni	Hodgson's frogmouth	黑顶蛙口夜鹰	II	Least concern	
Caprimulgiformes	Hemiprocnidae	Hemiprocne coronata	Crested treeswift	凤头雨燕	II	Least concern	
Caprimulgiformes	Apodidae	Aerodramus fuciphagus	Edible-nest swiftlet	爪哇金丝燕	II	Least concern	
Caprimulgiformes	Apodidae	Hirundapus cochinchinensis	Silver-backed needletail	灰喉针尾雨燕	II	Least concern	
Cuculiformes	Cuculidae	Centropus sinensis	Greater coucal	褐翅鸦鹃	II	Least concern	
Cuculiformes	Cuculidae	Centropus bengalensis	Lesser coucal	小鸦鹃	II	Least concern	
Otidiformes	Otididae	Otis tarda	Great bustard	大鸨	I	Endangered species	II
Otidiformes	Otididae	Chlamydotis macqueenii	Asian houbara	波斑鸨	I	Vulnerable species	I
Otidiformes	Otididae	Tetrax tetrax	Little bustard	小鸨	I	Near threatened	II
Gruiformes	Rallidae	Coturnicops exquisitus	Swinhoe's rail	花田鸡	II	Least Concern	
Gruiformes	Rallidae	Crex crex	Corn crake	长脚秧鸡	II	Least Concern	
Gruiformes	Rallidae	Zapornia bicolor	Black-tailed crake	棕背田鸡	II	Least Concern	
Gruiformes	Rallidae	Zapornia parva	Little crake	姬田鸡	II	Least Concern	
Gruiformes	Rallidae	Zapornia paykullii	Band-bellied crake	斑胁田鸡	II	Near threatened	
Gruiformes	Rallidae	Porphyrio porphyrio	Western swamphen	紫水鸡	II	Least concern	
Gruiformes	Gruidae	Grus leucogeranus	Siberian crane	白鹤	I	Critically endangered	I
Gruiformes	Gruidae	Grus canadensis	Sandhill crane	沙丘鹤	II	Least concern	II
Gruiformes	Gruidae	Grus vipio	White-naped crane	白枕鹤	I	Vulnerable species	I
Gruiformes	Gruidae	Grus antigone	Sarus crane	赤颈鹤	I	Vulnerable species	II
Gruiformes	Gruidae	Grus japonensis	Red-crowned crane	丹顶鹤	I	Vulnerable species	I
Gruiformes	Gruidae	Grus grus	Common crane	灰鹤	II	Least concern	II
Gruiformes	Gruidae	Grus monacha	Hooded crane	白头鹤	I	Vulnerable species	I
Gruiformes	Gruidae	Grus nigricollis	Black-necked crane	黑颈鹤	I	Near threatened	I
Charadriiformes	Burhinidae	Esacus recurvirostris	Great stone-curlew	大石鸻	II	Near threatened	
Charadriiformes	Ibidorhynchidae	Ibidorhyncha struthersii	Ibisbill	鹮嘴鹬	II	Least concern	
Charadriiformes	Charadriidae	Vanellus gregarius	Sociable lapwing	黄颊麦鸡	II	Critically Endangered	
Charadriiformes	Jacanidae	Hydrophasianus chirurgus	Pheasant-tailed jacana	水雉	II	Least concern	
Charadriiformes	Jacanidae	Metopidius indicus	Bronze-winged jacana	铜翅水雉	II	Least concern	
Charadriiformes	Scolopacidae	Gallinago nemoricola	Wood snipe	林沙锥	II	Vulnerable species	
Charadriiformes	Scolopacidae	Limnodromus semipalmatus	Asian dowitcher	半蹼鹬	II	Near threatened	
Charadriiformes	Scolopacidae	Numenius minutus	Little curlew	小杓鹬	II	Least concern	
Charadriiformes	Scolopacidae	Numenius arquata	Eurasian curlew	白腰杓鹬	II	Near threatened	
Charadriiformes	Scolopacidae	Numenius madagascariensis	Eurasian curlew	大杓鹬	II	Endangered species	
Charadriiformes	Scolopacidae	Tringa guttifer	Nordmann's greenshank	小青脚鹬	I	Endangered species	I
Charadriiformes	Scolopacidae	Arenaria interpres	Ruddy turnstone	翻石鹬	II	Near threatened	
Charadriiformes	Scolopacidae	Calidris tenuirostris	Great knot	大滨鹬	II	Endangered species	
Charadriiformes	Scolopacidae	Calidris pygmaea	Spoon-billed sandpiper	勺嘴鹬	I	Critically endangered	
Charadriiformes	Scolopacidae	Calidris falcinellus	Broad-billed sandpiper	阔嘴鹬	II	Vulnerable species	
Charadriiformes	Glareolidae	Glareola lactea	Small pratincole	灰燕鸻	II	Least concern	
Charadriiformes	Laridae	Saundersilarus saundersi	Saunders's gull	黑嘴鸥	I	Vulnerable species	
Charadriiformes	Laridae	Hydrocoloeus minutus	Little gull	小鸥	II	Least concern	
Charadriiformes	Laridae	Ichthyaetus relictus	Relict gull	遗鸥	I	Vulnerable species	I
Charadriiformes	Laridae	Thalasseus bergii	Greater crested tern	大凤头燕鸥	II	Least concern	
Charadriiformes	Laridae	Thalasseus bernsteini	Chinese crested tern	中华凤头燕鸥	I	Critically Endangered	
Charadriiformes	Laridae	Sterna aurantia	River tern	河燕鸥	I	Vulnerable species	
Charadriiformes	Laridae	Sterna acuticauda	Black-bellied tern	黑腹燕鸥	II	Endangered species	
Charadriiformes	Laridae	Chlidonias niger	Black tern	黑浮鸥	II	Least concern	
Charadriiformes	Alcidae	Synthliboramphus wumizusume	Japanese murrelet	冠海雀	II	Vulnerable species	
Procellariiformes	Diomedeidae	Phoebastria nigripes	Black-footed albatross	黑脚信天翁	I	Near threatened	
Procellariiformes	Diomedeidae	Phoebastria albatrus	Short-tailed albatross	短尾信天翁	I	Vulnerable species	II
Ciconiiformes	Ciconiidae	Mycteria leucocephala	Painted stork	彩鹳	I	Least concern	
Ciconiiformes	Ciconiidae	Ciconia nigra	Black stork	黑鹳	I	Least concern	II
Ciconiiformes	Ciconiidae	Ciconia ciconia	White stork	白鹳	I	Least concern	
Ciconiiformes	Ciconiidae	Ciconia boyciana	Oriental stork	东方白鹳	I	Endangered species	I
Ciconiiformes	Ciconiidae	Leptoptilos javanicus	Lesser adjutant	秃鹳	II	Near threatened	
Suliformes	Fregatidae	Fregata andrewsi	Christmas frigatebird	白腹军舰鸟	I	Vulnerable species	I
Suliformes	Fregatidae	Fregata minor	Great frigatebird	黑腹军舰鸟	II	Least concern	
Suliformes	Fregatidae	Fregata ariel	Lesser frigatebird	白斑军舰鸟	II	Least concern	
Suliformes	Sulidae	Sula dactylatra	Masked booby	蓝脸鲣鸟	II	Least concern	
Suliformes	Sulidae	Sula sula	Red-footed booby	红脚鲣鸟	II	Least concern	
Suliformes	Sulidae	Sula leucogaster	Brown booby	褐鲣鸟	II	Least concern	
Suliformes	Phalacrocoracidae	Microcarbo niger	Little cormorant	黑颈鸬鹚	II	Least concern	
Suliformes	Phalacrocoracidae	Phalacrocorax pelagicus	Pelagic cormorant	海鸬鹚	II	Least concern	
Pelecaniformes	Threskiornithidae	Threskiornis melanocephalus	Black-headed ibis	黑头白鹮	I	Least concern	
Pelecaniformes	Threskiornithidae	Pseudibis davisoni	White-shouldered ibis	白肩黑鹮	I	Critically endangered	
Pelecaniformes	Threskiornithidae	Nipponia nippon	Crested ibis	朱鹮	I	Endangered species	I
Pelecaniformes	Threskiornithidae	Plegadis falcinellus	Glossy ibis	彩鹮	I	Least concern	
Pelecaniformes	Threskiornithidae	Platalea leucorodia	Eurasian spoonbill	白琵鹭	II	Least concern	II
Pelecaniformes	Threskiornithidae	Platalea minor	Black-faced spoonbill	黑脸琵鹭	I	Vulnerable species	
Pelecaniformes	Ardeidae	Ixobrychus minutus	Little bittern	小苇鳽	II	Least concern	
Pelecaniformes	Ardeidae	Gorsachius magnificus	White-eared night heron	海南鳽	I	Near threatened	
Pelecaniformes	Ardeidae	Gorsachius goisagi	Japanese night heron	栗头鳽	II	Vulnerable species	
Pelecaniformes	Ardeidae	Gorsachius melanolophus	Malayan night heron	黑冠鳽	II	Least concern	
Pelecaniformes	Ardeidae	Ardea insignis	White-bellied heron	白腹鹭	I	Critically endangered	
Pelecaniformes	Ardeidae	Egretta sacra	Pacific reef heron	岩鹭	II	Least concern	
Pelecaniformes	Ardeidae	Egretta eulophotes	Chinese egret	黄嘴白鹭	I	Vulnerable species	
Pelecaniformes	Pelecanidae	Pelecanus onocrotalus	Great white pelican	白鹈鹕	I	Least concern	
Pelecaniformes	Pelecanidae	Pelecanus philippensis	Spot-billed pelican	斑嘴鹈鹕	I	Near threatened	
Pelecaniformes	Pelecanidae	Pelecanus crispus	Dalmatian pelican	卷羽鹈鹕	I	Near threatened	I
Accipitriformes	Pandionidae	Pandion haliaetus	Osprey	鹗	II	Least concern	II
Accipitriformes	Accipitridae	Elanus caeruleus	Black-winged kite	黑翅鸢	II	Least concern	II
Accipitriformes	Accipitridae	Gypaetus barbatus	Bearded vulture	胡兀鹫	I	Near threatened	II
Accipitriformes	Accipitridae	Neophron percnopterus	Egyptian vulture	白兀鹫	II	Endangered species	II
Accipitriformes	Accipitridae	Pernis apivorus	European honey buzzard	鹃头蜂鹰	II	Least concern	II
Accipitriformes	Accipitridae	Pernis ptilorhynchus	Crested honey buzzard	凤头蜂鹰	II	Least concern	II
Accipitriformes	Accipitridae	Aviceda jerdoni	Jerdon's baza	褐冠鹃隼	II	Least concern	II
Accipitriformes	Accipitridae	Aviceda leuphotes	Black baza	黑冠鹃隼	II	Least concern	II
Accipitriformes	Accipitridae	Gyps fulvus	Eurasian griffon vulture	兀鹫	II	Least concern	II
Accipitriformes	Accipitridae	Gyps indicus	Indian vulture	长嘴兀鹫	II	Critically Endangered	II
Accipitriformes	Accipitridae	Gyps bengalensis	White-rumped vulture	白背兀鹫	I	Critically Endangered	II
Accipitriformes	Accipitridae	Gyps himalayensis	Himalayan vulture	高山兀鹫	II	Near threatened	II
Accipitriformes	Accipitridae	Sarcogyps calvus	Red-headed vulture	黑兀鹫	I	Critically endangered	II
Accipitriformes	Accipitridae	Aegypius monachus	Cinereous vulture	秃鹫	I	Near threatened	II
Accipitriformes	Accipitridae	Spilornis cheela	Crested serpent eagle	蛇雕	II	Least concern	II
Accipitriformes	Accipitridae	Circaetus gallicus	Short-toed snake eagle	短趾雕	II	Least concern	II
Accipitriformes	Accipitridae	Nisaetus cirrhatus	Changeable hawk-eagle	凤头鹰雕	II	Least concern	II
Accipitriformes	Accipitridae	Nisaetus nipalensis	Mountain hawk-eagle	鹰雕	II	Near threatened	II
Accipitriformes	Accipitridae	Lophotriorchis kienerii	Rufous-bellied eagle	棕腹隼雕	II	Near threatened	II
Accipitriformes	Accipitridae	Ictinaetus malaiensis	Black eagle	林雕	II	Least concern	II
Accipitriformes	Accipitridae	Clanga clanga	Greater spotted eagle	乌雕	I	Vulnerable species	II
Accipitriformes	Accipitridae	Hieraaetus pennatus	Booted eagle	靴隼雕	II	Least concern	II
Accipitriformes	Accipitridae	Aquila nipalensis	Steppe eagle	草原雕	I	Endangered species	II
Accipitriformes	Accipitridae	Aquila heliaca	Eastern imperial eagle	白肩雕	I	Vulnerable species	I
Accipitriformes	Accipitridae	Aquila chrysaetos	Golden eagle	金雕	I	Least concern	II
Accipitriformes	Accipitridae	Aquila fasciata	Bonelli's eagle	白腹隼雕	II	Least concern	II
Accipitriformes	Accipitridae	Accipiter trivirgatus	Crested goshawk	凤头鹰	II	Least concern	II
Accipitriformes	Accipitridae	Accipiter badius	Shikra	褐耳鹰	II	Least concern	II
Accipitriformes	Accipitridae	Accipiter soloensis	Chinese sparrowhawk	赤腹鹰	II	Least concern	II
Accipitriformes	Accipitridae	Accipiter gularis	Japanese sparrowhawk	日本松雀鹰	II	Least concern	II
Accipitriformes	Accipitridae	Accipiter virgatus	Besra	松雀鹰	II	Least concern	II
Accipitriformes	Accipitridae	Accipiter nisus	Eurasian sparrowhawk	雀鹰	II	Least concern	II
Accipitriformes	Accipitridae	Accipiter gentilis	Eurasian goshawk	苍鹰	II	Least concern	II
Accipitriformes	Accipitridae	Circus aeruginosus	Western marsh harrier	白头鹞	II	Least concern	II
Accipitriformes	Accipitridae	Circus spilonotus	Eastern marsh harrier	白腹鹞	II	Least concern	II
Accipitriformes	Accipitridae	Circus cyaneus	Hen harrier	白尾鹞	II	Least concern	II
Accipitriformes	Accipitridae	Circus macrourus	Pallid harrier	草原鹞	II	Near threatened	II
Accipitriformes	Accipitridae	Circus melanoleucos	Pied harrier	鹊鹞	II	Least concern	II
Accipitriformes	Accipitridae	Circus pygargus	Montagu's harrier	乌灰鹞	II	Least concern	II
Accipitriformes	Accipitridae	Milvus migrans	Black kite	黑鸢	II	Least concern	II
Accipitriformes	Accipitridae	Haliastur indus	Brahminy kite	栗鸢	II	Least concern	II
Accipitriformes	Accipitridae	Haliaeetus leucogaster	White-bellied sea eagle	白腹海雕	I	Least concern	II
Accipitriformes	Accipitridae	Haliaeetus leucoryphus	Pallas's fish eagle	玉带海雕	I	Endangered species	II
Accipitriformes	Accipitridae	Haliaeetus albicilla	White-tailed eagle	白尾海雕	I	Least concern	I
Accipitriformes	Accipitridae	Haliaeetus pelagicus	Steller's sea eagle	虎头海雕	I	Vulnerable species	II
Accipitriformes	Accipitridae	Icthyophaga humilis	Lesser fish eagle	渔雕	II	Near threatened	II
Accipitriformes	Accipitridae	Butastur teesa	White-eyed buzzard	白眼鵟鹰	II	Least concern	II
Accipitriformes	Accipitridae	Butastur liventer	Rufous-winged buzzard	棕翅鵟鹰	II	Least concern	II
Accipitriformes	Accipitridae	Butastur indicus	Grey-faced buzzard	灰脸鵟鹰	II	Least concern	II
Accipitriformes	Accipitridae	Buteo lagopus	Rough-legged buzzard	毛脚鵟	II	Least concern	II
Accipitriformes	Accipitridae	Buteo hemilasius	Upland buzzard	大鵟	II	Least concern	II
Accipitriformes	Accipitridae	Buteo japonicus	Eastern buzzard	普通鵟	II	Least concern	II
Accipitriformes	Accipitridae	Buteo refectus	Himalayan buzzard	喜山鵟	II	Least concern	II
Accipitriformes	Accipitridae	Buteo buteo	Common buzzard	欧亚鵟	II	Least concern	II
Accipitriformes	Accipitridae	Buteo rufinus	Long-legged buzzard	棕尾鵟	II	Least concern	II
Strigiformes	Strigidae	Otus spilocephalus	Mountain scops owl	黄嘴角鸮	II	Least concern	II
Strigiformes	Strigidae	Otus lettia	Collared scops owl	领角鸮	II	Least concern	II
Strigiformes	Strigidae	Otus semitorques	Japanese scops owl	北领角鸮	II	Least concern	II
Strigiformes	Strigidae	Otus brucei	Pallid scops owl	纵纹角鸮	II	Least concern	II
Strigiformes	Strigidae	Otus scops	Eurasian scops owl	西红角鸮	II	Least concern	II
Strigiformes	Strigidae	Otus sunia	Oriental scops owl	红角鸮	II	Least concern	II
Strigiformes	Strigidae	Otus elegans	Ryūkyū scops owl	优雅角鸮	II	Near threatened	II
Strigiformes	Strigidae	Bubo scandiacus	Snowy owl	雪鸮	II	Vulnerable species	II
Strigiformes	Strigidae	Bubo bubo	Eurasian eagle-owl	雕鸮	II	Least concern	II
Strigiformes	Strigidae	Bubo nipalensis	Spot-bellied eagle-owl	林雕鸮	II	Least concern	II
Strigiformes	Strigidae	Bubo blakistoni	Blakiston's fish-owl	毛腿雕鸮	I	Vulnerable species	II
Strigiformes	Strigidae	Ketupa zeylonensis	Brown fish owl	褐渔鸮	II	Least concern	II
Strigiformes	Strigidae	Ketupa flavipes	Tawny fish owl	黄腿渔鸮	II	Least concern	II
Strigiformes	Strigidae	Strix leptogrammica	Brown wood owl	褐林鸮	II	Least concern	II
Strigiformes	Strigidae	Strix aluco	Tawny owl	灰林鸮	II	Least concern	II
Strigiformes	Strigidae	Strix uralensis	Ural owl	长尾林鸮	II	Least concern	II
Strigiformes	Strigidae	Strix davidi	Père David's owl	四川林鸮	I	Least concern	II
Strigiformes	Strigidae	Strix nebulosa	Great grey owl	乌林鸮	II	Least concern	II
Strigiformes	Strigidae	Surnia ulula	Northern hawk-owl	猛鸮	II	Least concern	II
Strigiformes	Strigidae	Glaucidium passerinum	Eurasian pygmy owl	花头鸺鹠	II	Least concern	II
Strigiformes	Strigidae	Glaucidium brodiei	Collared owlet	领鸺鹠	II	Least concern	II
Strigiformes	Strigidae	Glaucidium cuculoides	Asian barred owlet	班头鸺鹠	II	Least concern	II
Strigiformes	Strigidae	Athene noctua	Little owl	纵纹腹小鸮	II	Least concern	II
Strigiformes	Strigidae	Athene brama	Spotted owlet	横斑腹小鸮	II	Least concern	II
Strigiformes	Strigidae	Aegolius funereus	Boreal owl	鬼鸮	II	Least concern	II
Strigiformes	Strigidae	Ninox scutulata	Brown boobook	鹰鸮	II	Least concern	II
Strigiformes	Strigidae	Ninox japonica	Northern boobook	日本鹰鸮	II	Least concern	II
Strigiformes	Strigidae	Asio otus	Long-eared owl	长耳鸮	II	Least concern	II
Strigiformes	Strigidae	Asio flammeus	Short-eared owl	短耳鸮	II	Least concern	II
Strigiformes	Tytonidae	Tyto alba	Western barn owl	仓鸮	II	Least concern	II
Strigiformes	Tytonidae	Tyto longimembris	Eastern grass owl	草鸮	II	Least concern	II
Strigiformes	Tytonidae	Phodilus badius	Oriental bay owl	栗鸮	II	Least concern	II
Trogoniformes	Trogonidae	Harpactes oreskios	Orange-breasted trogon	橙胸咬鹃	II	Least concern	
Trogoniformes	Trogonidae	Harpactes erythrocephalus	Red-headed trogon	红头咬鹃	II	Least concern	
Trogoniformes	Trogonidae	Harpactes wardi	Ward's trogon	红腹咬鹃	II	Least concern	
Bucerotiformes	Bucerotidae	Anorrhinus austeni	Austen's brown hornbill	白喉犀鸟	I	Near threatened	II
Bucerotiformes	Bucerotidae	Anthracoceros albirostris	Oriental pied hornbill	冠斑犀鸟	I	Least concern	II
Bucerotiformes	Bucerotidae	Buceros bicornis	Great hornbill	双角犀鸟	I	Vulnerable species	I
Bucerotiformes	Bucerotidae	Aceros nipalensis	Rufous-necked hornbill	棕颈犀鸟	I	Vulnerable species	I
Bucerotiformes	Bucerotidae	Rhyticeros undulatus	Wreathed hornbill	花冠皱盔犀鸟	I	Vulnerable species	II
Coraciiformes	Meropidae	Nyctyornis amictus	Red-bearded bee-eater	赤须蜂虎	II	Least concern	
Coraciiformes	Meropidae	Nyctyornis athertoni	Blue-bearded bee-eater	蓝须蜂虎	II	Least concern	
Coraciiformes	Meropidae	Merops orientalis	Asian green bee-eater	绿喉蜂虎	II	Least concern	
Coraciiformes	Meropidae	Merops persicus	Blue-cheeked bee-eater	蓝颊蜂虎	II	Least concern	
Coraciiformes	Meropidae	Merops philippinus	Blue-tailed bee-eater	栗喉蜂虎	II	Least concern	
Coraciiformes	Meropidae	Merops ornatus	Rainbow bee-eater	彩虹蜂虎	II	Least concern	
Coraciiformes	Meropidae	Merops viridis	Blue-throated bee-eater	蓝喉蜂虎	II	Least concern	
Coraciiformes	Meropidae	Merops leschenaulti	Chestnut-headed bee-eater	栗头蜂虎	II	Least concern	
Coraciiformes	Alcedinidae	Pelargopsis capensis	Stork-billed kingfisher	鹳嘴翡翠	II	Least concern	
Coraciiformes	Alcedinidae	Halcyon smyrnensis	White-throated kingfisher	白胸翡翠	II	Least concern	
Coraciiformes	Alcedinidae	Alcedo meninting	Blue-eared kingfisher	蓝耳翠鸟	II	Least concern	
Coraciiformes	Alcedinidae	Alcedo hercules	Blyth's kingfisher	斑头大翠鸟	II	Near threatened	
Piciformes	Picidae	Dendrocopos leucopterus	White-winged woodpecker	白翅啄木鸟	II	Least concern	
Piciformes	Picidae	Picoides tridactylus	Eurasian three-toed woodpecker	三趾啄木鸟	II	Least concern	
Piciformes	Picidae	Dryocopus javensis	White-bellied woodpecker	白腹黑啄木鸟	II	Least concern	I
Piciformes	Picidae	Dryocopus javensis	White-bellied woodpecker	白腹黑啄木鸟	II	Least concern	
Piciformes	Picidae	Dryocopus javensis	White-bellied woodpecker	白腹黑啄木鸟	II	Least concern	
Piciformes	Picidae	Dryocopus martius	Black woodpecker	黑啄木鸟	II	Least concern	
Piciformes	Picidae	Chrysophlegma flavinucha	Greater yellownape	大黄冠啄木鸟	II	Least concern	
Piciformes	Picidae	Picus chlorolophus	Lesser yellownape	黄冠啄木鸟	II	Least concern	
Piciformes	Picidae	Picus rabieri	Red-collared woodpecker	红颈绿啄木鸟	II	Near threatened	
Piciformes	Picidae	Mulleripicus pulverulentus	Great slaty woodpecker	大灰啄木鸟	II	Vulnerable species	
Falconiformes	Falconidae	Microhierax caerulescens	Collared falconet	红腿小隼	II	Least concern	II
Falconiformes	Falconidae	Microhierax melanoleucos	Pied falconet	白腿小隼	II	Least concern	II
Falconiformes	Falconidae	Falco naumanni	Lesser kestrel	黄爪隼	II	Least concern	II
Falconiformes	Falconidae	Falco tinnunculus	Common kestrel	红隼	II	Least concern	II
Falconiformes	Falconidae	Falco vespertinus	Red-footed falcon	西红脚隼	II	Vulnerable species	II
Falconiformes	Falconidae	Falco amurensis	Amur falcon	红脚隼	II	Least concern	II
Falconiformes	Falconidae	Falco columbarius	Merlin	灰背隼	II	Least concern	II
Falconiformes	Falconidae	Falco subbuteo	Eurasian hobby	燕隼	II	Least concern	II
Falconiformes	Falconidae	Falco severus	Oriental hobby	猛隼	II	Least concern	II
Falconiformes	Falconidae	Falco cherrug	Saker falcon	猎隼	I	Endangered species	II
Falconiformes	Falconidae	Falco rusticolus	Gyrfalcon	矛隼	I	Least concern	I
Falconiformes	Falconidae	Falco peregrinus	Peregrine falcon	游隼	II	Least concern	I
Psittaciformes	Psittacidae	Loriculus vernalis	Vernal hanging parrot	短尾鹦鹉	II	Least concern	II
Psittaciformes	Psittacidae	Psittinus cyanurus	Blue-rumped parrot	蓝腰鹦鹉	II	Near threatened	II
Psittaciformes	Psittacidae	Psittacula eupatria	Alexandrine parakeet	亚历山大鹦鹉	II	Least concern	II
Psittaciformes	Psittacidae	Psittacula krameri	Rose-ringed parakeet	红领绿鹦鹉	II	Least concern	
Psittaciformes	Psittacidae	Psittacula himalayana	Slaty-headed parakeet	青头鹦鹉	II	Least concern	II
Psittaciformes	Psittacidae	Psittacula finschii	Grey-headed parakeet	灰头鹦鹉	II	Near threatened	II
Psittaciformes	Psittacidae	Psittacula roseata	Blossom-headed parakeet	花头鹦鹉	II	Near threatened	II
Psittaciformes	Psittacidae	Psittacula derbiana	Lord Derby's parakeet	大紫胸鹦鹉	II	Near threatened	I
Psittaciformes	Psittacidae	Psittacula alexandri	Red-breasted parakeet	绯胸鹦鹉	II	Near threatened	II
Passeriformes	Pittidae	Pitta phayrei	Eared pitta	双辫八色鸫	II	Least concern	
Passeriformes	Pittidae	Pitta nipalensis	Blue-naped pitta	蓝枕八色鸫	II	Least concern	
Passeriformes	Pittidae	Pitta soror	Blue-rumped pitta	蓝背八色鸫	II	Least concern	
Passeriformes	Pittidae	Pitta oatesi	Rusty-naped pitta	栗头八色鸫	II	Least concern	
Passeriformes	Pittidae	Pitta cyanea	Blue pitta	蓝八色鸫	II	Least concern	
Passeriformes	Pittidae	Pitta sordida	Western hooded pitta	绿胸八色鸫	II	Least concern	
Passeriformes	Pittidae	Pitta nympha	Fairy pitta	仙八色鸫	II	Least concern	II
Passeriformes	Pittidae	Pitta moluccensis	Blue-winged pitta	蓝翅八色鸫	II	Least concern	II
Passeriformes	Eurylaimidae	Psarisomus dalhousiae	Long-tailed broadbill	长尾阔嘴鸟	II	Least concern	
Passeriformes	Eurylaimidae	Serilophus lunatus	Silver-breasted broadbill	银胸丝冠鸟	II	Least concern	
Passeriformes	Oriolidae	Oriolus mellianus	Silver oriole	鹊鹂	II	Endangered species	
Passeriformes	Dicruridae	Dicrurus remifer	Lesser racket-tailed drongo	小盘尾	II	Least concern	
Passeriformes	Dicruridae	Dicrurus paradiseus	Greater racket-tailed drongo	大盘尾	II	Least concern	
Passeriformes	Corvidae	Perisoreus internigrans	Sichuan jay	黑头噪鸦	I	Near threatened	
Passeriformes	Corvidae	Cissa chinensis	Common green magpie	蓝绿鹊	II	Least concern	
Passeriformes	Corvidae	Cissa hypoleuca	Indochinese green magpie	黄胸绿鹊	II	Least concern	
Passeriformes	Corvidae	Podoces hendersoni	Mongolian ground jay	黑尾地鸦	II	Least concern	
Passeriformes	Corvidae	Podoces biddulphi	Xinjiang ground jay	白尾地鸦	II	Near threatened	
Passeriformes	Paridae	Poecile superciliosus	White-browed tit	白眉山雀	II	Least concern	
Passeriformes	Paridae	Poecile davidi	Père David's tit	红腹山雀	II	Least concern	
Passeriformes	Alaudidae	Mirafra javanica	Singing bush lark	歌百灵	II	Least concern	
Passeriformes	Alaudidae	Melanocorypha mongolica	Mongolian lark	蒙古百灵	II	Least concern	
Passeriformes	Alaudidae	Alauda arvensis	Eurasian skylark	云雀	II	Least concern	
Passeriformes	Acrocephalidae	Acrocephalus sorghophilus	Speckled reed warbler	细纹苇莺	II	Critically endangered	
Passeriformes	Pycnonotidae	Pycnonotus taivanus	Styan's bulbul	台湾鹎	II	Vulnerable species	
Passeriformes	Sylviidae	Lioparus chrysotis	Golden-breasted fulvetta	金胸雀鹛	II	Least concern	
Passeriformes	Sylviidae	Moupinia poecilotis	Rufous-tailed babbler	宝兴鹛雀	II	Least concern	
Passeriformes	Sylviidae	Fulvetta striaticollis	Chinese fulvetta	中华雀鹛	II	Least concern	
Passeriformes	Sylviidae	Cholornis paradoxus	Three-toed parrotbill	三趾鸦雀	II	Least concern	
Passeriformes	Sylviidae	Sinosuthora conspicillata	Spectacled parrotbill	白眶鸦雀	II	Least concern	
Passeriformes	Sylviidae	Sinosuthora zappeyi	Grey-hooded parrotbill	暗色鸦雀	II	Vulnerable species	
Passeriformes	Sylviidae	Sinosuthora przewalskii	Przevalski's parrotbill	灰冠鸦雀	I	Least concern	
Passeriformes	Sylviidae	Neosuthora davidiana	Short-tailed parrotbill	短尾鸦雀	II	Least concern	
Passeriformes	Sylviidae	Paradoxornis heudei	Reed parrotbill	震旦鸦雀	II	Near threatened	
Passeriformes	Zosteropidae	Zosterops erythropleurus	Chestnut-flanked white-eye	红胁绣眼鸟	II	Least concern	
Passeriformes	Timaliidae	Spelaeornis kinneari	Pale-throated wren-babbler	淡喉鹩鹛	II	Vulnerable species	
Passeriformes	Timaliidae	Stachyris nonggangensis	Nonggang babbler	弄岗鹩鹛	II	Vulnerable species	
Passeriformes	Pellorneidae	Schoeniparus variegaticeps	Golden-fronted fulvetta	金额雀鹛	I	Vulnerable species	
Passeriformes	Leiothrichidae	Babax waddelli	Giant babax	大草鹛	II	Near threatened	
Passeriformes	Leiothrichidae	Babax koslowi	Tibetan babax	棕草鹛	II	Near threatened	
Passeriformes	Leiothrichidae	Garrulax canorus	Chinese hwamei	画眉	II	Least concern	II
Passeriformes	Leiothrichidae	Garrulax owstoni	Hainan hwamei	海南画眉	II	Least concern	II
Passeriformes	Leiothrichidae	Garrulax taewanus	Taiwan hwamei	台湾画眉	II	Near threatened	II
Passeriformes	Leiothrichidae	Garrulax maesi	Grey laughingthrush	褐胸噪鹛	II	Least concern	
Passeriformes	Leiothrichidae	Garrulax sukatschewi	Snowy-cheeked laughingthrush	黑额山噪鹛	I	Vulnerable species	
Passeriformes	Leiothrichidae	Garrulax lunulatus	Barred laughingthrush	斑背噪鹛	II	Least concern	
Passeriformes	Leiothrichidae	Garrulax bieti	White-speckled laughingthrush	白点噪鹛	I	Vulnerable species	
Passeriformes	Leiothrichidae	Garrulax maximus	Giant laughingthrush	大噪鹛	II	Least concern	
Passeriformes	Leiothrichidae	Garrulax ocellatus	Spotted laughingthrush	眼纹噪鹛	II	Least concern	
Passeriformes	Leiothrichidae	Garrulax chinensis	Black-throated laughingthrush	黑喉噪鹛	II	Least concern	
Passeriformes	Leiothrichidae	Garrulax courtoisi	Blue-crowned laughingthrush	蓝冠噪鹛	I	Critically endangered	
Passeriformes	Leiothrichidae	Garrulax berthemyi	Buffy laughingthrush	棕噪鹛	II	Least concern	
Passeriformes	Leiothrichidae	Trochalopteron elliotii	Elliot's laughingthrush	橙翅噪鹛	II	Least concern	
Passeriformes	Leiothrichidae	Trochalopteron formosum	Red-winged laughingthrush	红翅噪鹛	II	Least concern	
Passeriformes	Leiothrichidae	Trochalopteron milnei	Red-tailed laughingthrush	红尾噪鹛	II	Least concern	
Passeriformes	Leiothrichidae	Liocichla bugunorum	Bugun liocichla	黑冠薮鹛	I	Critically endangered	
Passeriformes	Leiothrichidae	Liocichla omeiensis	Emei Shan liocichla	灰胸薮鹛	I	Vulnerable species	
Passeriformes	Leiothrichidae	Leiothrix argentauris	Silver-eared mesia	银耳相思鸟	II	Least concern	II
Passeriformes	Leiothrichidae	Leiothrix lutea	Red-billed leiothrix	红嘴相思鸟	II	Least concern	II
Passeriformes	Certhiidae	Certhia tianquanensis	Red-billed leiothrix	四川旋木雀	II	Least concern	
Passeriformes	Sittidae	Sitta yunnanensis	Yunnan nuthatch	滇䴓	II	Least concern	
Passeriformes	Sittidae	Sitta magna	Giant nuthatch	巨䴓	II	Endangered species	
Passeriformes	Sittidae	Sitta formosa	Beautiful nuthatch	丽䴓	II	Vulnerable species	
Passeriformes	Sturnidae	Gracula religiosa	Common hill myna	鹩哥	II	Least concern	II
Passeriformes	Turdidae	Turdus feae	Grey-sided thrush	褐头鸫	II	Vulnerable species	
Passeriformes	Turdidae	Cochoa purpurea	Purple cochoa	紫宽嘴鸫	II	Least concern	
Passeriformes	Turdidae	Cochoa viridis	Green cochoa	绿宽嘴鸫	II	Least concern	
Passeriformes	Muscicapidae	Larvivora ruficeps	Rufous-headed robin	棕头歌鸲	I	Endangered species	
Passeriformes	Muscicapidae	Calliope calliope	Siberian rubythroat	红喉歌鸲	II	Least concern	
Passeriformes	Muscicapidae	Calliope obscura	Blackthroat	黑喉歌鸲	II	Vulnerable species	
Passeriformes	Muscicapidae	Calliope pectardens	Firethroat	金胸歌鸲	II	Near threatened	
Passeriformes	Muscicapidae	Luscinia svecica	Bluethroat	蓝喉歌鸲	II	Least concern	
Passeriformes	Muscicapidae	Luscinia megarhynchos	Common nightingale	新疆歌鸲	II	Least concern	
Passeriformes	Muscicapidae	Tarsiger hyperythrus	Rufous-breasted bush robin	棕腹林鸲	II	Least concern	
Passeriformes	Muscicapidae	Phoenicurus alaschanicus	Przevalski's redstart	贺兰山红尾鸲	II	Near threatened	
Passeriformes	Muscicapidae	Saxicola insignis	White-throated bush chat	白喉石鹡	II	Vulnerable species	
Passeriformes	Muscicapidae	Cyornis brunneatus	Brown-chested jungle flycatcher	白喉林鹟	II	Vulnerable species	
Passeriformes	Muscicapidae	Niltava davidi	Fujian niltava	棕腹大仙鹟	II	Least concern	
Passeriformes	Muscicapidae	Niltava grandis	Large niltava	大仙鹟	II	Least concern	
Passeriformes	Prunellidae	Prunella koslowi	Kozlov's accentor	贺兰山岩鹨	II	Least concern	
Passeriformes	Urocynchramidae	Urocynchramus pylzowi	Przevalski's finch	朱鹀	II	Least concern	
Passeriformes	Fringillidae	Carpodacus sillemi	Sillem's rosefinch	褐头朱雀	II	Data deficient	
Passeriformes	Fringillidae	Carpodacus roborowskii	Tibetan rosefinch	藏雀	II	Least concern	
Passeriformes	Fringillidae	Carpodacus roseus	Pallas's rosefinch	北朱雀	II	Least concern	
Passeriformes	Fringillidae	Loxia curvirostra	Red crossbill	红交嘴雀	II	Least concern	
Passeriformes	Emberizidae	Emberiza siemsseni	Slaty bunting	蓝鹀	II	Least concern	
Passeriformes	Emberizidae	Emberiza jankowskii	Jankowski's bunting	栗斑腹鹀	I	Endangered species	
Passeriformes	Emberizidae	Emberiza aureola	Yellow-breasted bunting	黄胸鹀	I	Critically endangered	
Passeriformes	Emberizidae	Emberiza koslowi	Tibetan bunting	藏鹀	II	Least concern	

=== Reptiles ===
Protected and endangered reptile species of China
indicates species endemic to China

Order	Family	Scientific name	Common name	Chinese name	Protection class in China	IUCN Red List	CITES App'x
Crocodilia	Alligatoridae	Alligator sinensis	Chinese alligator	扬子鳄	I	Critically endangered	I
Squamata	Varanidae	Varanus bengalensis	Bengal monitor	孟加拉巨蜥		Near threatened	
Squamata	Varanidae	Varanus salvator	Water monitor	巨蜥	I	Least concern	
Squamata	Shinisauridae	Shinisaurus crocodilurus	Chinese crocodile lizard	中国鳄蜥	I	Endangered species	
Squamata	Gekkonidae	Gekko gecko	Tokay gecko	大壁虎	II	Least concern	
Squamata	Pythonidae	Python molurus	Indian python	蟒	I	Near threatened	I
Squamata	Viperidae	Vipera ursinii	Meadow viper	草原蝰		Vulnerable species	I
Squamata	Viperidae	Protobothrops mangshanensis	Mang Mountain pit viper	莽山烙铁头蛇		Endangered species	
Squamata	Colubridae	Hebius metusium	Wa Shan keelback	瓦屋山腹链蛇		Endangered species	
Squamata	Colubridae	Calamaria yunnanensis	Yunnan reed snake	云南两头蛇		Endangered species	
Squamata	Colubridae	Euprepiophis perlacea	Sichuan rat snake	横斑丽蛇		Endangered species	
Squamata	Colubridae	Elaphe schrenkii	Manchurian black water snake	東北黑水蛇	?		?
Squamata	Typhlopidae	Typhlops lazelli	Lazell's blind snake	香港盲蛇		Critically endangered	
Testudines	Trionychidae	Palea steindachneri	Wattle-necked softshell turtle	山瑞鳖	II	Endangered species	
Testudines	Trionychidae	Pelochelys cantorii	Cantor's giant softshell turtle	鼋	I	Endangered species	
Testudines	Trionychidae	Rafetus swinhoei	Yangtze giant softshell turtle	斑鳖		Critically endangered	
Testudines	Cheloniidae	Caretta caretta	Loggerhead sea turtle	蠵龟	II	Endangered species	I
Testudines	Cheloniidae	Chelonia mydas	Green sea turtle	绿海龟	II	Endangered species	I
Testudines	Cheloniidae	Eretmochelys imbricata	Hawksbill sea turtle	玳瑁	II	Critically endangered	I
Testudines	Cheloniidae	Lepidochelys olivacea	Olive ridley sea turtle	太平洋丽龟	II	Vulnerable species	I
Testudines	Dermochelyidae	Dermochelys coriacea	Leatherback sea turtle	棱皮龟	II	Critically endangered	I
Testudines	Testudinidae	Testudo horsfieldi	Russian tortoise	四爪陆龟	I	Vulnerable species	
Testudines	Testudinidae	Manouria impressa	Impressed tortoise	凹甲陆龟	II	Vulnerable species	
Testudines	Platysternidae	Platysternon megacephalum	Big-headed turtle	大头龟		Critically endangered	I
Testudines	Geoemydidae	Cuora aurocapitata	Yellow-headed box turtle	金头闭壳龟		Critically endangered	I
Testudines	Geoemydidae	Cuora flavomarginata	Chinese box turtle	食蛇龟		Endangered species	
Testudines	Geoemydidae	Geoemyda spengleri	Black-breasted leaf turtle	地龟	II	Endangered species	
Testudines	Geoemydidae	Cuora trifasciata	Golden coin turtle	三线闭壳龟	II	Critically endangered	
Testudines	Geoemydidae	Cuora yunnanensis	Yunnan box turtle	云南闭壳龟	II	Critically endangered	
Testudines	Geoemydidae	Cuora galbinifrons	Indochinese box turtle	黄额闭壳龟		Critically endangered	
Testudines	Geoemydidae	Cuora mccordi	McCord's box turtle	百色闭壳龟		Critically endangered	
Testudines	Geoemydidae	Cuora mouhotii	Keeled box turtle	锯缘摄龟		Endangered species	
Testudines	Geoemydidae	Cuora pani	Pan's box turtle	潘氏闭壳龟		Critically endangered	
Testudines	Geoemydidae	Cuora zhoui	Zhou's box turtle	周氏闭壳龟		Critically endangered	
Testudines	Geoemydidae	Mauremys mutica	Yellow pond turtle	黄喉拟水龟		Endangered species	
Testudines	Geoemydidae	Mauremys nigricans	Red-necked pond turtle	黑颈乌龟		Endangered species	
Testudines	Geoemydidae	Mauremys reevesii	Chinese pond turtle	草龟		Endangered species	
Testudines	Geoemydidae	Ocadia sinensis	Chinese stripe-necked turtle	花龟		Endangered species	
Testudines	Geoemydidae	Sacalia bealei	Beale's eyed turtle	眼斑水龟		Critically endangered	
Testudines	Geoemydidae	Sacalia quadriocellata	Four-eyed turtle	四眼斑水龟		Endangered species	

=== Amphibians ===
Protected and endangered amphibian species of China
indicates species endemic to China

Order	Family	Scientific name	Common name	Chinese name	Protection class in China	IUCN Red List	CITES App'x
Caudata	Cryptobranchidae	Andrias davidianus	Chinese giant salamander	大鯢	II	Critically endangered	I
Caudata	Hynobiidae	Hynobius chinensis	Chinese salamander	中国小鲵		Endangered species	
Caudata	Hynobiidae	Batrachuperus londongensis	Longdong stream salamander	龙洞山溪鲵		Endangered species	
Caudata	Hynobiidae	Hynobius amjiensis	Amji's salamander	安吉小鲵		Critically endangered	
Caudata	Hynobiidae	Hynobius formosanus	Taiwan salamander	台湾山椒鱼		Endangered species	
Caudata	Hynobiidae	Hynobius sonani	Sonan's salamander	楚南小鲵		Endangered species	
Caudata	Salamandridae	Paramesotriton guanxiensis	Guangxi warty newt	广西瘰螈		Endangered species	
Caudata	Salamandridae	Ranodon sibiricus	Central Asian salamander	新疆北鲵		Endangered species	
Caudata	Salamandridae	Tylototriton asperrimus	Black knobby newt	细痣疣螈	II	Near threatened	
Caudata	Salamandridae	Echinotriton chinhaiensis	Chinhai spiny newt	镇海疣螈	II	Critically endangered	
Caudata	Salamandridae	Tylototriton kweichowensis	Red-tailed knobby newt	贵州疣螈	II	Vulnerable species	
Caudata	Salamandridae	Tylototriton taliangensis	Taliang knobby newt	大涼疣螈	II	Near threatened	
Caudata	Salamandridae	Tylototriton verrucosus	Himalayan newt	细瘰疣螈	II	Least concern	
Caudata	Salamandridae	Tylototriton hainanensis	Hainan knobby newt	海南疣螈		Endangered species	
Caudata	Salamandridae	Cynops orphicus	Dayang newt	汕头蝾螈		Endangered species	
Caudata	Salamandridae	Echinotriton andersoni	Anderson's crocodile newt	琉球棘螈		Critically endangered	
Caudata	Salamandridae	Cynops wolterstorffi	Yunnan lake newt	滇池蝾螈		Extinct	
Anura	Ranidae	Hoplobatrachus tigerinus	Indus Valley bullfrog	虎紋蛙	II	Least concern	
Anura	Ranidae	Amolops hainanensis	Hainan torrent frog	海南湍蛙		Critically endangered	
Anura	Ranidae	Amolops hongkongensis	Hong Kong cascade frog	香港瀑蛙		Endangered species	
Anura	Ranidae	Glandirana minima	Fujian frog	小山蛙		Critically endangered	
Anura	Ranidae	Nanorana maculosa	Piebald spiny frog	花棘蛙		Endangered species	
Anura	Ranidae	Rana chevronta	Chevron-spotted brown frog	峰斑林蛙		Critically Endangered	
Anura	Ranidae	Nanorana unculuanus	Yunnan Asian frog	棘肛蛙		Endangered species	
Anura	Ranidae	Rana sauteri	Sauter's brown frog	梭德氏蛙		Endangered species	
Anura	Ranidae	Nanorana yunnanensis	Yunnan spiny frog	双团棘胸蛙		Endangered species	
Anura	Ranidae	Quasipaa boulengeri	Boulenger's spiny frog	西藏齿突蟾		Endangered species	
Anura	Ranidae	Quasipaa robertingeri	Hejiang spiny frog	合江棘蛙		Endangered species	
Anura	Ranidae	Odorrana kuangwuensis	Kwangwu odorous frog	光雾臭蛙		Critically endangered	
Anura	Ranidae	Pelophylax tenggerensis	Yellow river frog	腾格里蛙		Endangered species	
Anura	Bufonidae	Parapelophryne scalpta	Hainan flathead toad	鳞皮厚蹼蟾			
Anura	Microhylidae	Micryletta steinegeri	Stejneger's narrow-mouthed toad	台湾娟娃		Endangered species	
Anura	Rhacophoridae	Liuixalus ocellatus	Ocellated bubble-nest frog	眼斑小树蛙		Endangered species	
Anura	Rhacophoridae	Liuixalus romeri	Romer's tree frog	卢文氏树蛙		Endangered species	
Anura	Rhacophoridae	Rhacophorus arvalis	Farmland green tree frog	诸罗树蛙		Endangered species	
Anura	Rhacophoridae	Rhacophorus aurantiventris	Orange-belly tree frog	橙腹树蛙		Endangered species	
Anura	Rhacophoridae	Rhacophorus minimus	none			Endangered species	
Anura	Rhacophoridae	Rhacophorus yaoshanensis	none	瑶山树蛙		Endangered species	
Anura	Megophryidae	Leptobrachium boringii	Emei moustache toad	峨眉髭蟾		Endangered species	
Anura	Megophryidae	Leptobrachium leishanense	Leishan spiny toad	雷山髭蟾		Endangered species	
Anura	Megophryidae	Leptolalax alpinus	none	高山掌突蟾		Endangered species	
Anura	Megophryidae	Oreolalax chuanbeiensis	Chuanbei toothed toad	川北齿蟾		Endangered species	
Anura	Megophryidae	Oreolalax liangbeiensis	Liangbei toothed toad	凉北齿蟾		Critically endangered	
Anura	Megophryidae	Oreolalax omeimontis	Omei toothed toad	峨眉齿蟾		Endangered species	
Anura	Megophryidae	Oreolalax pingii	Ping's toothed toad	秉志齿蟾		Endangered species	
Anura	Megophryidae	Oreolalax puxiongensis	Puxiong toothed toad	普雄齿蟾		Endangered species	
Anura	Megophryidae	Scutiger chintingensis	Chinting alpine toad	金顶齿突蟾		Endangered species	
Anura	Megophryidae	Scutiger maculatus	Piebald alpine toad	花齿突蟾		Critically endangered	
Anura	Megophryidae	Scutiger muliensis	Muli cat-eyed toad	木里猫眼蟾		Endangered species	
Anura	Megophryidae	Scutiger ningshanensis	Ningshan alpine toad	宁陕齿突蟾		Endangered species	
Anura	Megophryidae	Scutiger pingwuensis	Pingwu alpine toad	平武齿突蟾		Endangered species	
Anura	Megophryidae	Xenophrys brachykolos	Short-legged horned toad	短腳角蟾		Endangered species	

=== Fish ===
==== Ray-finned fish (Actinopterygii) ====
Protected and endangered ray-finned fish species of China
indicates species endemic to China

Order	Family	Scientific name	Common name	Chinese name	Protection class in China	IUCN Red List	CITES App'x
Perciformes	Sciaenidae	Bahaba taipingensis	Chinese bahaba	黄唇鱼	II	Critically endangered	
Scorpaeniformes	Cottidae	Trachidermus fasciatus	Roughskin sculpin	四鳃鲈	II		
Syngnathiformes	Syngnathidae	Hippocampus kelloggi	Great seahorse	线纹海马	II	Vulnerable species	
Cypriniformes	Catostomidae	Myxocyprinus asiaticus	Chinese high fin banded shark	胭脂鱼	II	Endangered species	
Cypriniformes	Cyprinidae	Tanichthys albonubes	White Cloud Mountain minnow	唐鱼	II	Data deficient	
Cypriniformes	Cyprinidae	Cyprinus pellegrini	Barbless carp	大头鲤	II	Data deficient	
Cypriniformes	Cyprinidae	Sinocyclocheilus grahami	Golden-line barbel	滇池金线鲃	II	Critically endangered	
Cypriniformes	Cyprinidae	Aspiorhynchus laticeps	Big-head schizothoracin	扁吻鱼	I	Endangered species	
Cypriniformes	Cyprinidae	Zacco taliensis	Dali schizothoracin	大理裂腹鱼	II		
Anguilliformes	Anguillidae	Anguilla marmorata	Marbled eel	花鳗鲡	II		
Salmoniformes	Salmonidae	Hucho bleekeri	Sichuan taimen	四川哲罗鲑	I	Critically endangered	
Salmoniformes	Salmonidae	Brachymystax lenok	Lenok	秦岭细鳞鲑	II		
Acipenseriformes	Acipenseridae	Acipenser sinensis	Chinese sturgeon	中华鲟	I	Critically endangered	II
Acipenseriformes	Acipenseridae	Acipenser dabryanus	Dabry's sturgeon	达氏鲟	I	Extinct in the wild	II
Acipenseriformes	Polyodontidae	Psephurus gladius	Chinese paddlefish	白鲟	I	Extinct	II
Siluriformes	Pangasiidae	Pangasianodon gigas	Mekong giant catfish	巨无齿𩷶		Critically endangered	I

==== Cartilaginous fish (Chondrichthyes) ====
Protected and endangered cartilaginous fish species of China

Order	Family	Scientific name	Common name	Chinese name	Protection class in China	IUCN Red List	CITES App'x
Pristiformes	Pristidae	Anoxypristis cuspidata	Knifetooth sawfish	尖齿锯鳐		Critically endangered	I
Pristiformes	Pristidae	Pristis zijsron	Longcomb sawfish	后鳍锯鳐		Critically endangered	I

=== Lancelet ===
Protected and endangered lancelet species of China

Order	Family	Scientific name	Common name	Chinese name	Protection class in China	IUCN Red List	CITES App'x
Amphioxiformes	Branchiostomatidae	Branchiostoma belcheri	Chinese amphioxus	文昌鱼	II		

== Endangered and protected plant species ==
=== Flora ===
Endangered and protected plant species, of the native and endemic Flora of China.

- Abies beshanzuensis — Baishanzu fir, Baishan fir.
- Abies fabri — Faber's fir
- Abies fanjingshanensis
- Abies recurvata
- Abies yuanbaoshanensis
- Abies ziyuanensis
- Cupressus chengiana
- Cupressus duclouxiana — Chinese cypress
- Cupressus gigantea
- Disanthus cercidifolius var. longipes
- Fissistigma cupreonitens
- Fissistigma tungfangense
- Magnolia delavayi — Chinese evergreen magnolia
- Picea brachytyla
- Picea neoveitchii
- Pinus dabeshanensis
- Pseudolarix amabilis — golden larch

== See also ==
- Endemic flora of China
- Wildlife in China
- Animal welfare and rights in China
- Protected areas of China
