= Cyprinus pellegrini =

Scientific classification
- Kingdom: Animalia
- Phylum: Chordata
- Class: Actinopterygii
- Order: Cypriniformes
- Family: Cyprinidae
- Subfamily: Cyprininae
- Genus: Cyprinus
- Species: C. pellegrini

Binomial name
- Cyprinus pellegrini T. L. Tchang, 1933

Species of fish

Cyprinus pellegrini is a species of cyprinid fish in the genus Cyprinus that is endemic to Yunnan, China. It is found in Xingyun Lake.

== See also ==
- List of endangered and protected species of China
