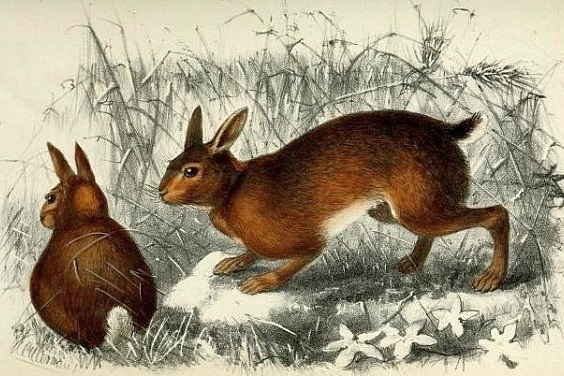

Conservation status
- Endangered (IUCN 3.1)

Scientific classification
- Kingdom: Animalia
- Phylum: Chordata
- Class: Mammalia
- Infraclass: Placentalia
- Order: Lagomorpha
- Family: Leporidae
- Genus: Lepus
- Species: L. hainanus

Binomial name
- Lepus hainanus Swinhoe, 1870
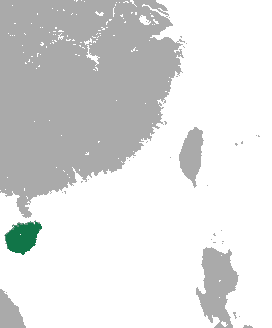
- Hainan Island. Hainan hare presently occurs only in the central west coastal zone.

= Hainan hare =

Species of mammal

The Hainan hare (Lepus hainanus) is a hare endemic to Hainan Island, China. The species was first described by Robert Swinhoe in 1870.

== Description ==
The Hainan hare is small; its body length is less than 40 centimetres (16 in) and weighs only 1.5 kilograms (3.3 lb). Its head is small and round. It has long ears that are longer than its hind feet. The upper part of the tail is black, while the under parts are white. It has a more colorful coat than most other hares: its back is brownish black and white, its belly is white, the fur on the flank is a mixture of brownish yellow and brownish white, and its limbs are dark brown.

== Behavior ==
The Hainan hare is a solitary animal and active at night or dusk. It does not live in burrows, but hides in bushes. It likes to live in flat, cool land with many bushes.

== Habitat and distribution ==
The Hainan hare is found in the dry grassland of western Hainan Island. It does not live in mountains or agricultural land. Nevertheless, a specimen is found in the eastern city of Wenchang in 2026.

== Threats ==
In previous years, the Hainan hare was slaughtered for skin, and this continues to some degree. It is also threatened by loss of habitat. Most of the habitat and animals on Hainan are threatened by similar factors, like the Hainan black crested gibbon, one of the world's rarest primates.

== Conservation ==
There is no control for overhunting of this hare and habitat destruction, even though it is considered endangered. Little is known on specific populations.

== See also ==
- List of endangered and protected species of China
