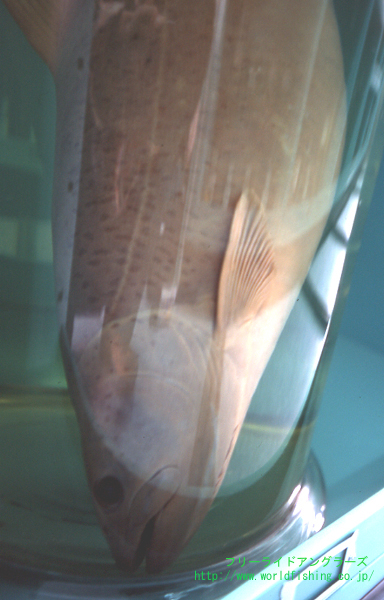
- preserved specimen

Conservation status
- Critically Endangered (IUCN 3.1)

Scientific classification
- Kingdom: Animalia
- Phylum: Chordata
- Class: Actinopterygii
- Division: Teleostei
- Order: Salmoniformes
- Family: Salmonidae
- Genus: Hucho
- Species: H. bleekeri

Binomial name
- Hucho bleekeri Kimura, 1934

Synonyms
- Hucho bleckeri Kimura, 1934

= Hucho bleekeri =

Species of fish

Hucho bleekeri, the Sichuan taimen, is a species of freshwater fish in the salmon family (Salmonidae), endemic to the Yangtze basin in China. Their typical habitat includes mountain streams and small rivers. They are found in rivers and tributaries in the Sichuan, Shaanxi, and Qinghai provinces. The Sichuan taimen is valued in various academic fields, and may prove helpful in studying fish evolution, and the impacts of climate change on inland, cold-water fish species. They are listed as "critically endangered" by the International Union for Conservation of Nature.

== Species description ==
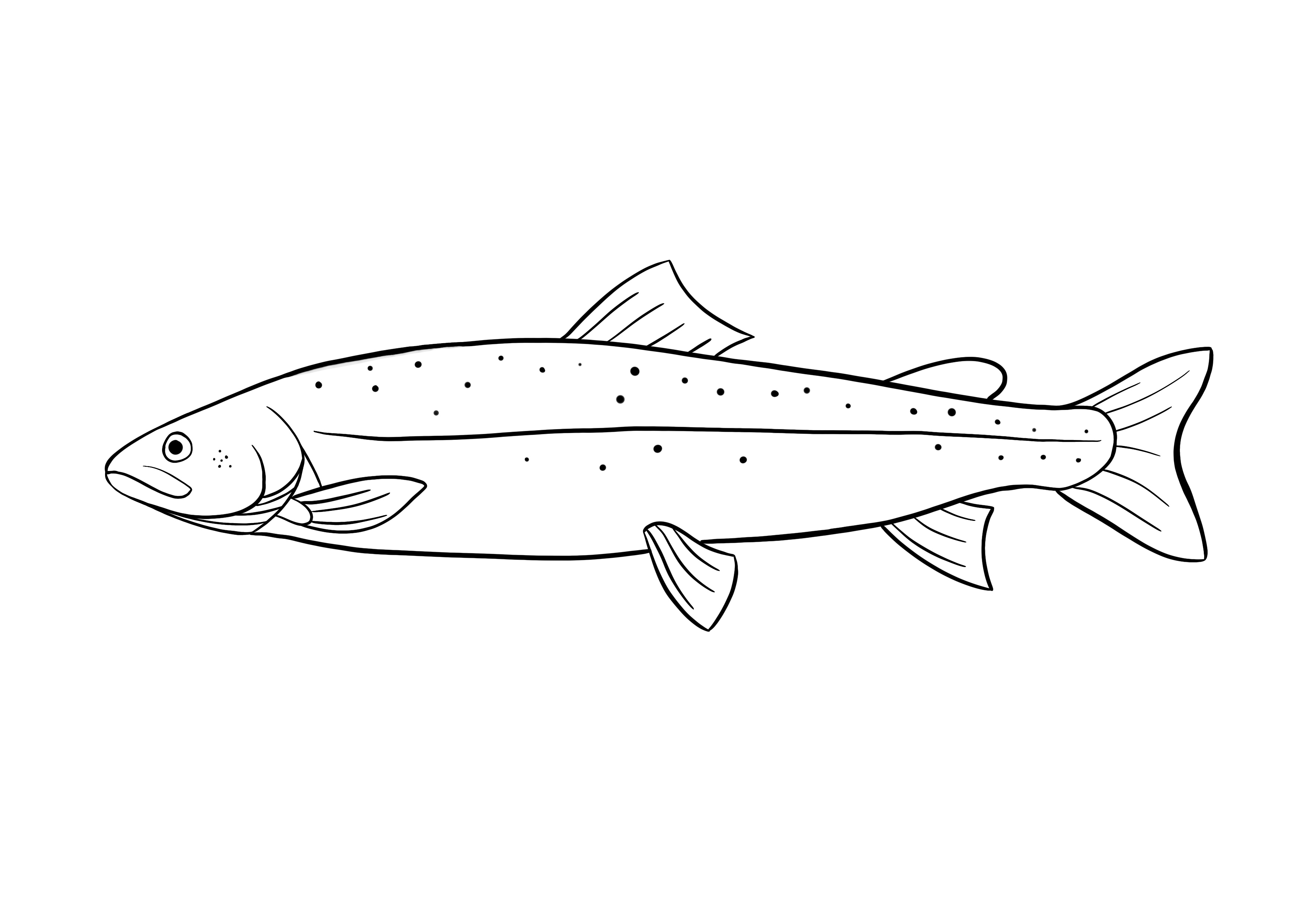
An illustration of Hucho bleekeri

The Sichuan taimen typically has a dark black, dorsal, and adipose fin; a silvery white underside; and small, irregular dark spots across the body, head, and gill cover. Their coloring can range from a darker orange/red, to a lighter tan/yellow depending on stage of life. They typically have between 125 and 152 scales, 14 gill rakers, and can grow to 72 cm (2 ft 3in) in length.

== Biology ==
The Sichuan taimen is a carnivorous species that feeds on aquatic insects, worms, and smaller fish. As juveniles, they feed on zooplankton and aquatic insects.

Females mature at four years of age; males earlier. The estimated generational time of Sichuan taimen is 17 years. Sichuan breeding season is from March to May. Fish seek out low current areas with dense vegetation on both sides of the bank, and temperatures between 4 and 9 °C. Adults dig shallow, oval nests in the soft bottom of the river, then lay their eggs inside. Once laid, the eggs are buried in the sand, where they develop. Their eggs are heavy, yellow, and non-sticky, approximately 3–4 mm in diameter. A 2020 study by Zhang et al. showed low levels of inbreeding in the Sichuan taimen in the Taibai River, indicating that there is a relatively high number of sexually mature individuals in this population.

== Distribution and habitats ==
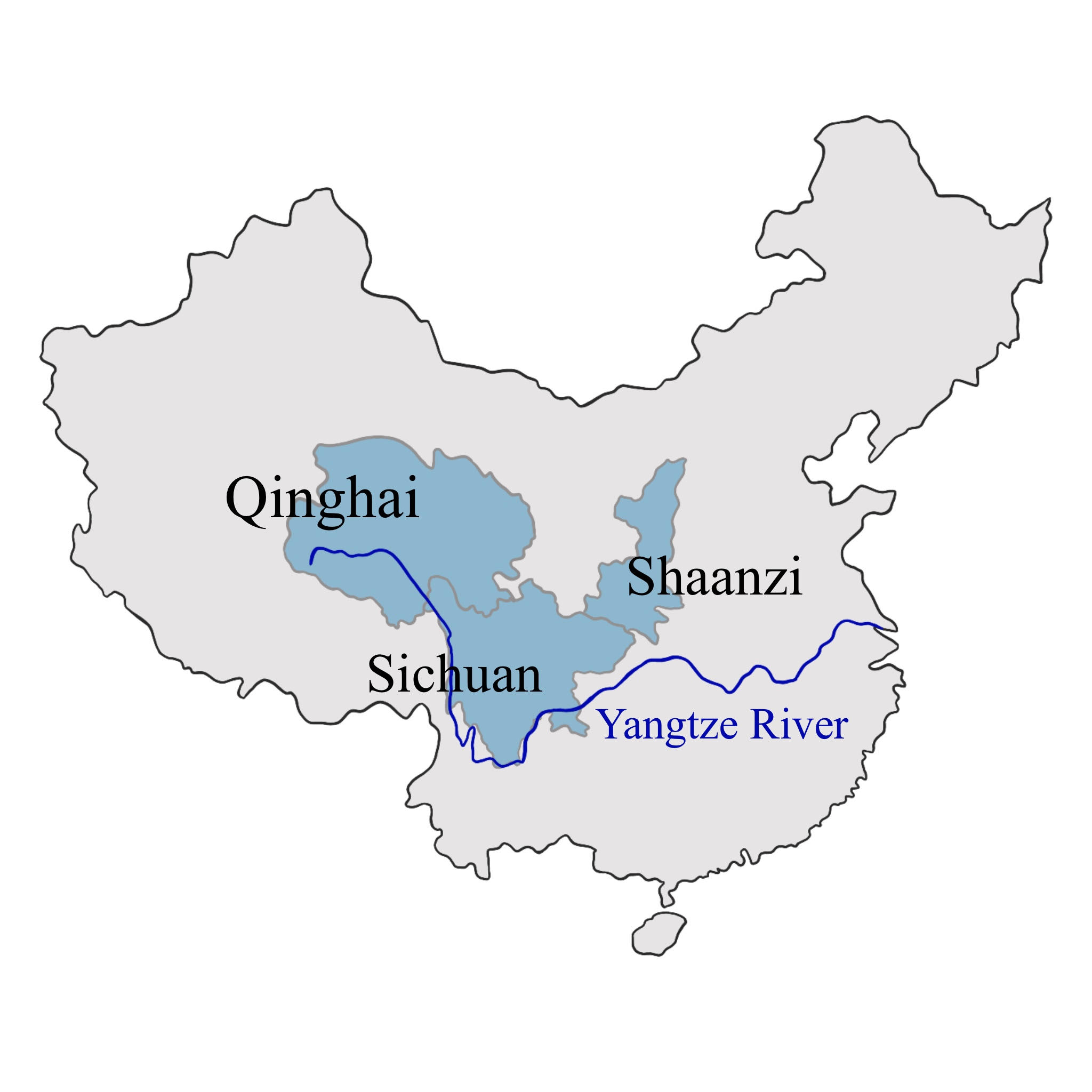
Geographic distribution of Hucho bleekeri

Sichuan taimen are endemic to the Yangtze basin in China. They are found in the upper tributaries of the Min and Yangtze River in Sichuan province, the upper and middle reaches of the Dadu River in Sichuan and Qinghai provinces, and the upper reaches of the Taibai and Xushui as well as the tributaries of the Hanjiang River in Shaanxi province.

The Sichuan taimen predominantly inhabits fast-flowing streams with sandy or gravel bottoms. The species prefers mountain brooks at 700–3,300 m (2,300– 10,800 ft) meters above sea level with high dissolved oxygen (>5 mg/L), and a low water temperature (less than 15 °C or 59 °F).

Juvenile Sichuan taimen distribution is affected by elevation, river sinuosity, and vegetation. They tend to prefer shallow waters (2 feet deep), with a flow velocity of 0.5 ± 0.24 m/s, and an offshore distance of roughly 8 m. Smaller juvenile fish prefer shallower habitats that are nearer to shore.

== Threats and conservation ==
The Sichuan taimen is a glacial relic that expanded long ago, but has since experienced a great loss in genetic diversity. This is reflected in the low number of closely related mtDNA haplotypes, the values of which are similar to those reported in other endangered taimen species. A 2014 study sequenced the entire mitochondrial genome of Sichuan taimen. The genome is 16,837 bp in length and contains 13 protein-coding genes, 2 ribosomal RNAs, 22 transfer RNAs.

According to the IUCN, the Sichuan taimen is threatened mostly by habitat loss from the construction of hydropower stations, erosion of soil due to deforestation, road construction, sand excavation, and illegal fishing. Recent studies have estimated the species has endured a 50–80% decline in population over the past three generations, and the decline is expected to continue at a rate of at least 20% over the next two generations (~34 years). An estimated 2,000 to 2,500 mature individuals remain in the wild. The Sichuan taimen was listed as a first-class protected species in China in 2021.

A major driver of Sichuan population decline is habitat loss. Since the 1960s, this species has lost an estimated 98% of its historic range. A 2023 study by Zhao et al. used creel netting and environmental DNA monitoring to detect the Sichuan population in the Qinling Mountain region. They found a population present in the Taibai River, and the Sujiagou Stream. The Taibai River population was originally re-discovered in 2012. In the upper region of the Xushui River basin, they did not find any evidence of the Sichuan taimen, indicating that they may have gone extinct in that area. This species may also be extinct in the Qingyi, Minjiang, and Dadu rivers, as no taimens have been reported caught from these regions in recent years.

In 2022, China invested an equivalent sum 63.4 billion US dollars in a hydropower dam along the Yangtze River. This station is expected to destroy four of the remaining Sichuan taiment spawning sites.

A 2023 study by Leng et al. achieved successful artificial propagation of this species. Not only does this study offer important insights to the reproduction of this species, but may prove vital for the long-term conservation of the Sichuan taimen.

== Cultural significance ==
In Mongolia, taimen are called the children of the river god, providing a connection between humans and spirits.

== See also ==
- List of endangered and protected species of China
