= Calamaria yunnanensis =

Conservation status
- Data Deficient (IUCN 3.1)

Scientific classification
- Kingdom: Animalia
- Phylum: Chordata
- Class: Reptilia
- Order: Squamata
- Suborder: Serpentes
- Family: Colubridae
- Genus: Calamaria
- Species: C. yunnanensis

Binomial name
- Calamaria yunnanensis Chernov, 1962
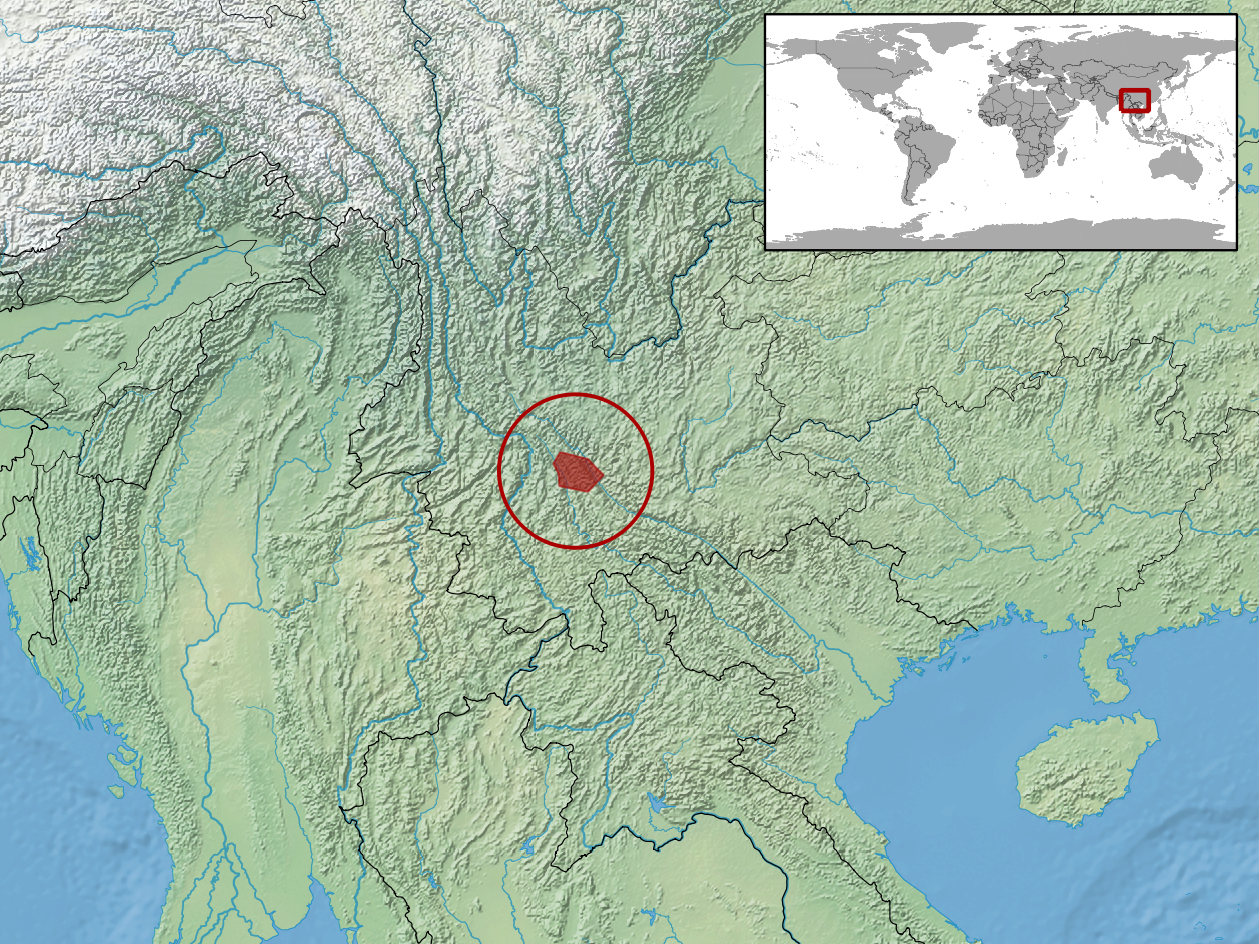

Species of snake

Calamaria yunnanensis is a species of snake of the family Colubridae. It is commonly known as the Yunnan reed snake.

== Range ==
The Yunnan reed snake is found in China, where it is known only from the Wuliang Mountains of central Yunnan (Jingdong and Nanjian counties).

== Description ==
The Yunnan reed snake is a small, slender snake, typically reaching lengths of around 30-40 cm.

It has a cylindrical body and a small, pointed head.The snake's coloration is generally brown or grayish-brown dorsally, with a lighter, sometimes yellowish, ventral surface.

== Habitat and ecology ==
The Yunnan reed snake inhabits montane forest and shrubland habitats in the Wuliang Mountains. It is believed to be a fossorial species, spending much of its time burrowing and moving through leaf litter and soil.

The snake's diet likely consists of small invertebrates, such as insects and earthworms, that it forages for underground.Little is known about the snake's reproductive biology and life cycle, as it is a poorly studied species.

== Conservation status ==
The Yunnan reed snake was classified as an endangered species on the IUCN Red List of Threatened Species in 2012, but reduced to data deficient in 2024. Its limited geographic range and habitat loss in the Wuliang Mountains due to deforestation and development are the primary threats to the species. Further research is needed to better understand the population status and ecology of the Yunnan reed snake in order to develop effective conservation strategies.
