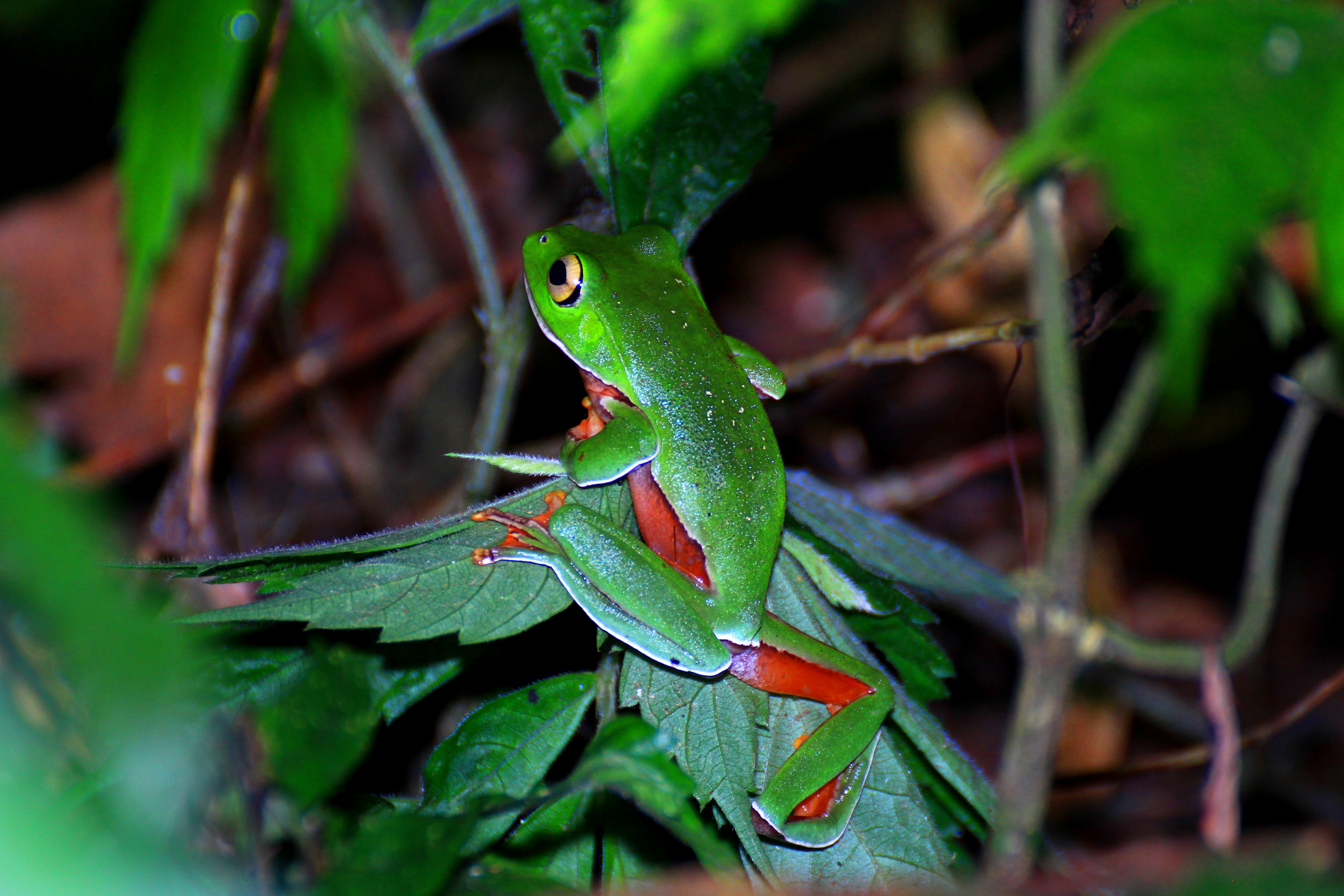

Conservation status
- Endangered (IUCN 3.1)

Scientific classification
- Kingdom: Animalia
- Phylum: Chordata
- Class: Amphibia
- Order: Anura
- Family: Rhacophoridae
- Genus: Zhangixalus
- Species: Z. aurantiventris

Binomial name
- Zhangixalus aurantiventris (Lue, Lai, and Chen, 1994)

Synonyms
- Rhacophorus aurantiventris Lue, Lai, and Chen, 1994

= Zhangixalus aurantiventris =

Species of frog

Zhangixalus aurantiventris (common names: orange-belly treefrog, orange-bellied treefrog) is a species of frog in the family Rhacophoridae. It is endemic to Taiwan. It is known from scattered localities across Taiwan at low to mid altitudes.

== Description ==
Adult males in the type series measure 47–53 mm (1.9–2.1 in) in snout–vent length. In a population in Taitung County, adult males measured 51–63 mm (2.0–2.5 in) and adult females 63–71 mm (2.5–2.8 in) in snout–vent length; mean male and female body mass were 8 and 15 grams, respectively. The snout is short and roundish. The tympanum is nearly circular; supratympanic fold is present. The fingers and the toes are webbed and bear discs, the former larger than the latter. Skin is smooth. The dorsum is dark green; pale yellowish spots may be present. The lips are white. The venter is orange-red. The iris is plain yellow; the pupil is vertical.

The male advertisement call sounds like a low-pitched "gree", lasting about 0.4 seconds.

== Habitat and ecology ==
This frog lives in forests. It breeds in holes in tree trunks and in buckets, but these microhabitats only exist in primary forest. This frog's range does include some protected parks in it: Fu-shan Nature Reserve and Li-chia Wildlife Refuge. This frog has been observed between 0 and 1000 meters above sea level.

== Conservation ==
Zhangixalus aurantiventris is a rare species. It is believed to be on decline, but reasons for this are not known—its habitat is not considered threatened. It is present in Fushan Nature Reserve and Lichia Wildlife Refuge. It is classified as "endangered" in the IUCN Red List of Threatened Species and in the Taiwan Wildlife Conservation Act. The IUCN estimates there are only 2500 of these frogs left in the world, with some subpopulations numbering only 250 mature individuals.

== Etymology ==
The name of the genus honors Zhang Ya-Ping from the Chinese Academy of Sciences, in recognition to his contributions to biodiversity and evolution research in China, in combination with ixalus, a common generic root for tree frogs. The specific name aurantiventris refers to the frog's "orange belly" from the latin aurantiacus.
