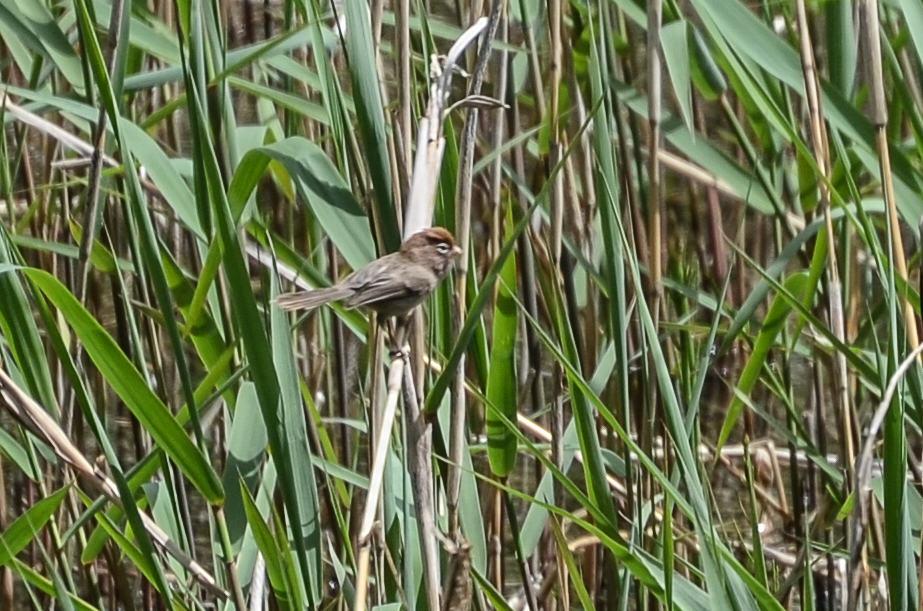

Conservation status
- Least Concern (IUCN 3.1)

Scientific classification
- Kingdom: Animalia
- Phylum: Chordata
- Class: Aves
- Order: Passeriformes
- Family: Paradoxornithidae
- Genus: Suthora
- Species: S. conspicillata

Binomial name
- Suthora conspicillata David, A, 1871

Synonyms
- Paradoxornis conspicillatus Sinosuthora conspicillata

= Spectacled parrotbill =

Species of bird

The spectacled parrotbill (Suthora conspicillata) is a species of bird in the family Paradoxornithidae. It is endemic to central China. Its natural habitats are temperate forests and subtropical or tropical moist montane forests.
