= Parapelophryne =

Conservation status
- Vulnerable (IUCN 3.1)

Scientific classification
- Kingdom: Animalia
- Phylum: Chordata
- Class: Amphibia
- Order: Anura
- Family: Bufonidae
- Genus: Parapelophryne; Fei, Ye, and Jiang, 2003
- Species: P. scalpta

Binomial name
- Parapelophryne scalpta (Liu and Hu, 1973)

Synonyms
- Nectophryne scalptus Liu and Hu in Liu, Hu, Fei, and Huang, 1973; Pelophryne scalpta (Liu and Hu, 1973); Pelophryne scalptus – incorrect gender of species name

Genus of amphibians

Parapelophryne is a monotypic genus of toads in the family Bufonidae. The only species is Parapelophryne scalpta. It is endemic to Hainan, China.

Parapelophryne scalpta occurs in evergreen broadleaf forests at elevations of 350–1,400 m (1,150–4,590 ft) above sea level. Males call near small streams, the probable breeding habitat of this species. It is threatened by habitat loss caused by smallholder farming activities and small-scale wood extraction. Its range overlaps with some protected areas.
