= Rana sauteri =

Conservation status
- Vulnerable (IUCN 3.1)'

Scientific classification
- Kingdom: Animalia
- Phylum: Chordata
- Class: Amphibia
- Order: Anura
- Family: Ranidae
- Genus: Rana
- Species: R. sauteri

Binomial name
- Rana sauteri Boulenger, 1909

Synonyms
- Rana multidenticulata Frost et al., 2006

Species of amphibian

Rana sauteri is a species of true frog endemic to Taiwan. It inhabits low-altitude hill forests and the associated streams. It is an endangered species threatened by habitat loss due to agriculture and infrastructure development. Common names recorded for Rana sauteri include Kanshirei Village frog, Taiwan groove-toed frog, Sauter's brown frog, and Taiwan pseudotorrent frog.

== Taxonomy ==
Rana sauteri was first described in 1909 by George Albert Boulenger on the basis of specimens collected on Taiwan by one H. Sauter. Boulenger noted resemblances to Rana japonica and Rana mortenseni (now Hylarana mortenseni) and thought the species bridged part of the gap between Hylorana (now spelled Hylarana) and the Rana temporaria group of species. In 1920, however, Boulenger placed the species in the subgenus Hylorana of the genus Rana. In 1991, Fei and colleagues placed it in a new genus Pseudorana together with Rana sangzhiensis and Rana weiningensis, and in 2000 they even placed it in a genus of its own, Pseudoamolops, because they thought it was more closely related to Amolops frogs than to other species of Pseudorana. However, molecular data place Rana sauteri well within the genus Rana, particularly the Rana temporaria group, and in 2006 Frost and colleagues therefore placed Pseudoamolops sauteri back in Rana.

In 1921, Smith described Rana sauteri var. johnsi as a variety of Rana sauteri from Vietnam. This form, which also occurs in Guangxi (southern China), Laos, Cambodia, and Thailand, has been recognized as a separate species, Rana johnsi (previously Pseudorana johnsi) since 1999. In addition, high-altitude populations of Rana sauteri were recognized as a separate species, Rana multidenticulata, in 1997.

== Description ==
Rana sauteri are medium-sized frogs: males grow to a snout–vent length of 35 mm (1.4 in) and females to 47 mm (1.9 in). They have a slender body with brown, red brown or dark brown upper surface.

== Conservation ==
There is currently a Sauter's frog conservation project in the Dashanbei area of Hengshan Township (橫山鄉), Hsinchu County.
