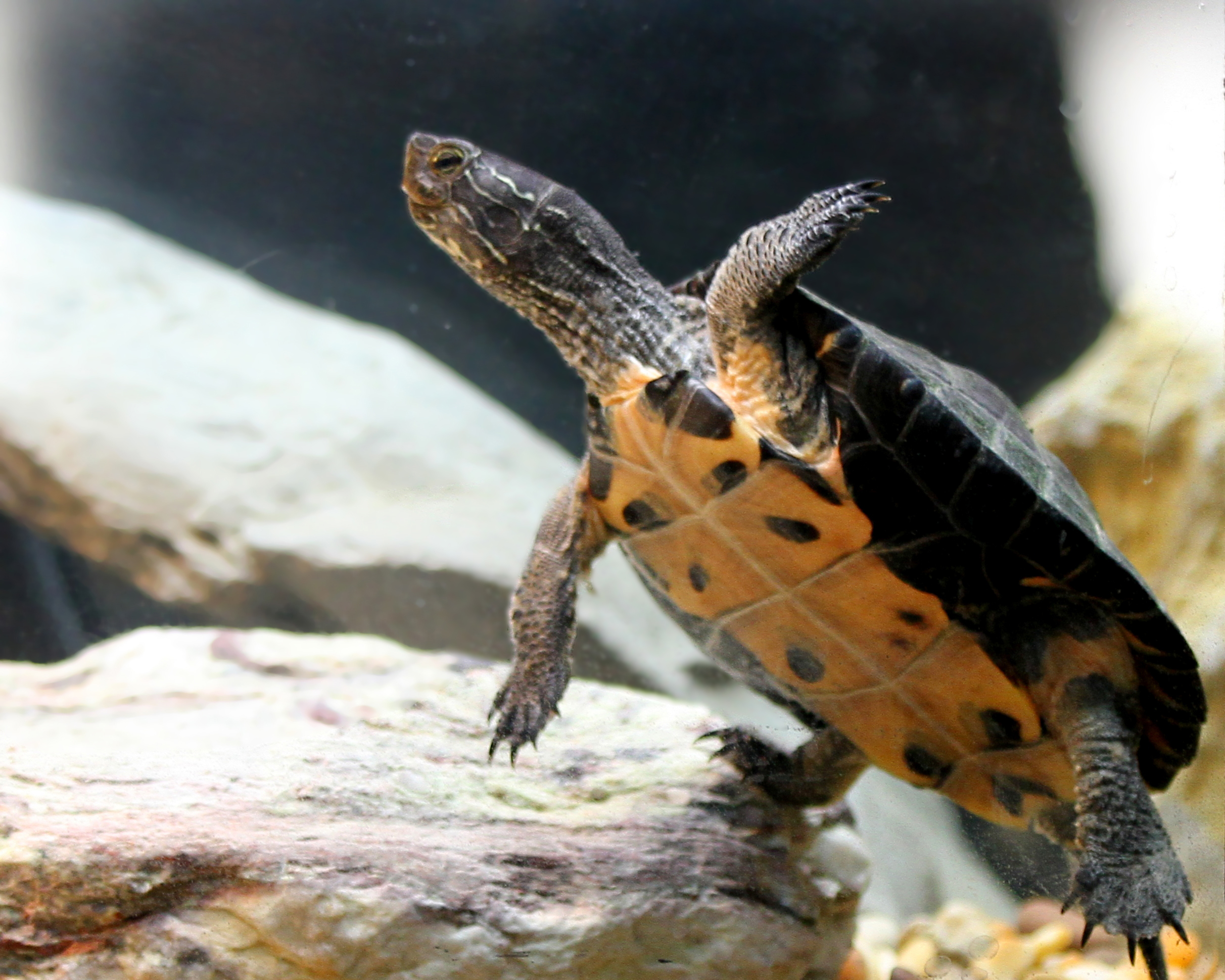
- Female M. nigricans

Conservation status
- Endangered (IUCN 2.3)
- CITES Appendix II

Scientific classification
- Kingdom: Animalia
- Phylum: Chordata
- Class: Reptilia
- Order: Testudines
- Suborder: Cryptodira
- Family: Geoemydidae
- Genus: Mauremys
- Species: M. nigricans

Binomial name
- Mauremys nigricans Grey, 1834

Synonyms
- Emys nigracans Gray, 1856 (ex errore); Clemmys nigricans Strauch, 1862; Damonia nigricans Gray, 1869; Chinemys nigricans Fang, 1934; Geoclemys kwangtungensis Pope, 1934; Clemmys kuangtungensis Mell, 1938 (ex errore); Chinemys kwangtungensis Bourret, 1941; Geoclemys palaeannamitica Bourret, 1941; Chinemys palaeannamitica Bour, 1980; Mauremys nigricans Spinks, Shaffer, Iverson & McCord, 2004

= Red-necked pond turtle =

Species of turtle

The red-necked pond turtle (Mauremys nigricans) is a species of turtles in the family Geoemydidae endemic to China. It is most likely restricted to Guangxi and Guangdong provinces, although pre-historic skull remains have been found in northern Vietnam and Hainan. Other common names include Kwangtung river turtle and black-necked pond turtle.

== Anatomy and morphology ==
A megacephalic form of the red-necked pond turtle exists, commonly called 'dumb-head'. This form is rarer than the smaller headed individuals. This species has strong sexual dimorphism with a significant size difference between males and females. The largest recorded male's carapace measured 185mm (7.2 in) in length whereas females with a size up to 298 mm (11.7 in) have been found.
