= Odorrana kuangwuensis =

Conservation status
- Vulnerable (IUCN 3.1)

Scientific classification
- Kingdom: Animalia
- Phylum: Chordata
- Class: Amphibia
- Order: Anura
- Family: Ranidae
- Genus: Odorrana
- Species: O. kuangwuensis

Binomial name
- Odorrana kuangwuensis (Liu & Hu, 1966)

Synonyms
- Rana kuangwuensis Liu & Hu, 1966

Species of frog

Odorrana kuangwuensis (common names: Kuang-wu Shan frog, Kuangwu odorous frog) is a species of frog in the family Ranidae that is endemic to China. It is found in northeastern Sichuan and northwestern Hubei. Its name refers to the type locality, Mount Guangwu (="Kuang-wu" in older romanization) in Nanjiang County, northern Sichuan.

Its natural habitats are large streams in hill forests. It is threatened by habitat loss.

Male Odorrana kuangwuensis grow to a snout–vent length of about 57 mm (2.2 in) and females to 69 mm (2.7 in).
