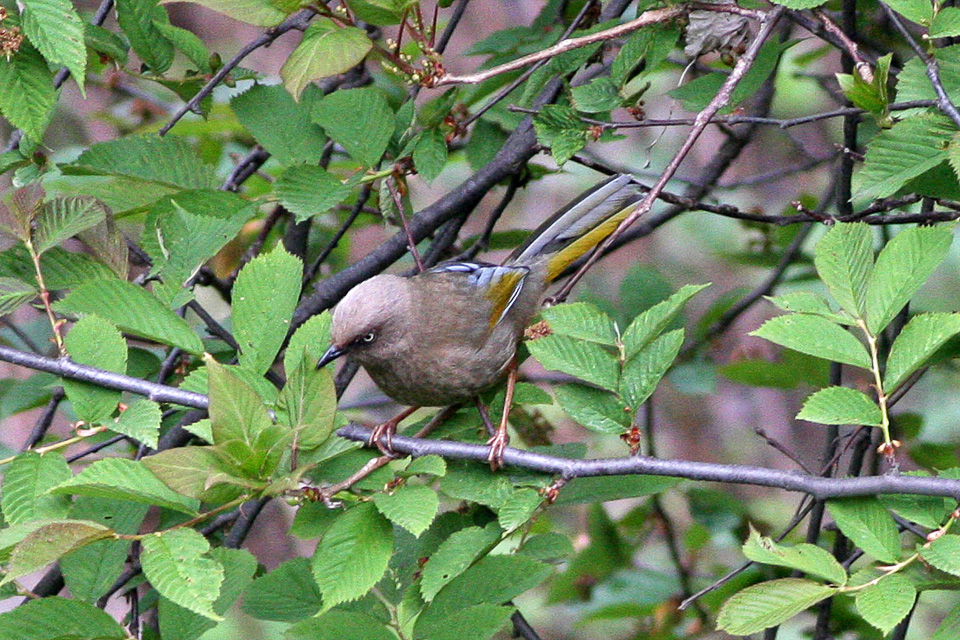

Conservation status
- Least Concern (IUCN 3.1)

Scientific classification
- Kingdom: Animalia
- Phylum: Chordata
- Class: Aves
- Order: Passeriformes
- Family: Leiothrichidae
- Genus: Trochalopteron
- Species: T. elliotii

Binomial name
- Trochalopteron elliotii Verreaux, 1871

Synonyms
- Garrulax elliotii

= Elliot's laughingthrush =

Species of bird

Elliot's laughingthrush (Trochalopteron elliotii) is a bird species in the family Leiothrichidae.

It is found in central China and far northeastern India, in shrubs and in forests with a combination of coniferous and deciduous trees.
