= Indotyphlops lazelli =

Conservation status
- Critically Endangered (IUCN 3.1)

Scientific classification
- Kingdom: Animalia
- Phylum: Chordata
- Class: Reptilia
- Order: Squamata
- Suborder: Serpentes
- Family: Typhlopidae
- Genus: Indotyphlops
- Species: I. lazelli

Binomial name
- Indotyphlops lazelli (Wallach & Pauwels, 2004)

Synonyms
- Typhlops lazelli Wallach & Pauwels, 2004

Species of snake

Indotyphlops lazelli, commonly known as the Hong Kong blind snake and Lazell's blind snake, is a species of snake in the family Typhlopidae. The species is endemic to Hong Kong.

== Etymology ==
The specific name, lazelli, is in honor of American herpetologist James Draper "Skip" Lazell.

== Description ==
I. lazelli is characterized by having 18 scale rows around the body. The mental is projecting, and the second and third upper labials overlap the shields above them.

== Habitat ==
The preferred natural habitat of I. lazelli is forest, at altitudes of 100–200 m (330–660 ft).

== Reproduction ==
I. lazelli is oviparous.
