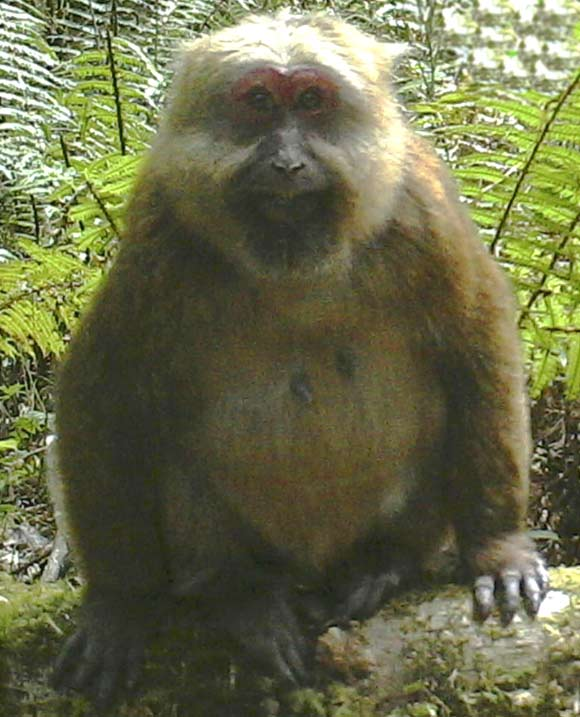
- Adult female
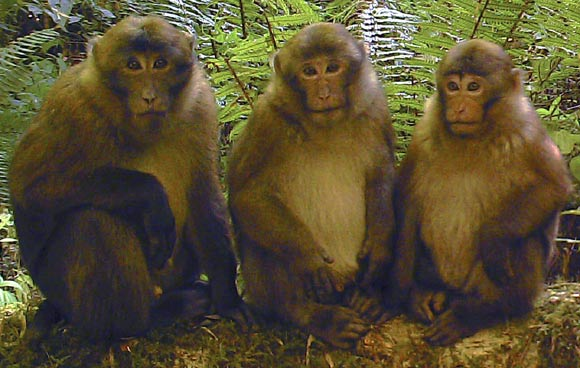
- Group of juveniles

Conservation status
- Endangered (IUCN 3.1)

Scientific classification
- Kingdom: Animalia
- Phylum: Chordata
- Class: Mammalia
- Order: Primates
- Family: Cercopithecidae
- Genus: Macaca
- Species: M. leucogenys

Binomial name
- Macaca leucogenys Li, Zhao, Fan, 2015

= White-cheeked macaque =

Species of Old World monkey

The white-cheeked macaque (Macaca leucogenys) is a species of macaque found only in Mêdog County in southeastern Tibet and Arunachal Pradesh in northeastern India. The white-cheeked macaque lives in forest habitats, from tropical forests to primary and secondary evergreen broad-leaved forests and mixed broadleaf-conifer forests. The species was first described by Chinese primatologists Cheng Li, Chao Zhao, and Peng-Fei Fan, in the American Journal of Primatology in 2015. It is one of twenty-three extant species in the genus Macaca, and the most recent to be formally described to science. While the species' exact conservation status has not yet been determined, it is likely threatened by poaching, deforestation, and increased human development of its habitat, much like the other primates which inhabit the area.

== Discovery ==
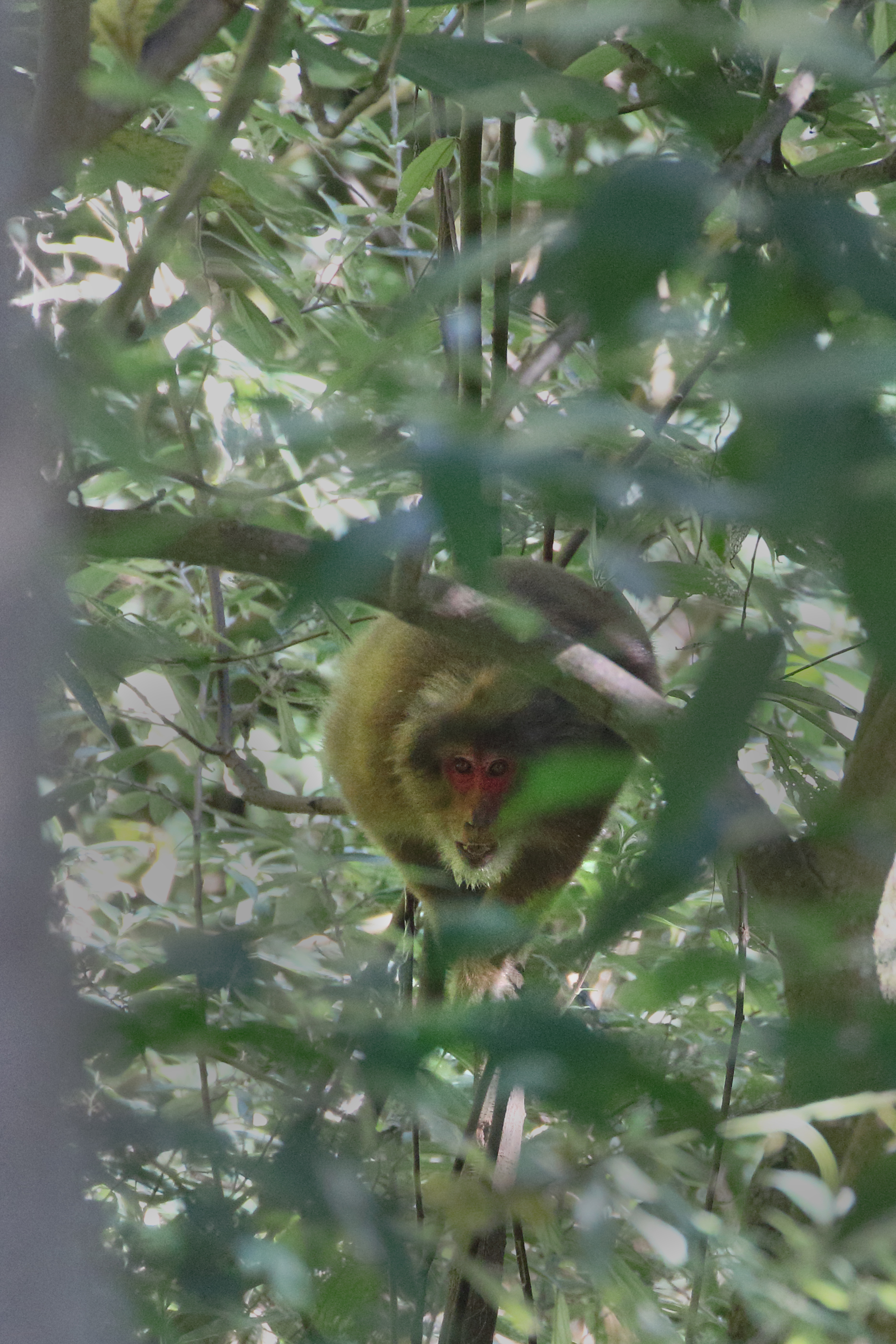
From Walong, Arunachal Pradesh, India.

The white-cheeked macaque was discovered and described in 2015. While specimens of the creature had been observed and known for many years prior, they were believed to be members of the species Macaca assamensis, the Assam macaque. After footage captured on a series camera traps in Tibet revealed numerous physical differences between the Assam macaque and the animals caught on tape (including more prominent whiskers, thicker neck hair, and differences in the shape of the genitalia), primatologists in China declared them to be a new species. Their research, along with a series of photographs of the species, was published in the July 2015 issue of the American Journal of Primatology.

In April 2016, a group of wildlife photographers and biologists spotted and photographed the white-cheeked macaque in Arunachal Pradesh, India. Prior to this sighting, the species was thought to exist only in Tibet.

== Appearance ==
Physiologically, the white-cheeked macaque is similar to the other members of the genus Macaca. It is robust and has a short tail. In terms of outward appearance, it closely resembles the Assam macaque, which is one of the reasons the two were believed to be the same species until recently. The main differences between the two include the presence of white, elongated whiskers on the face of the white-cheeked macaque, which are absent from other species. The whiskers begin to grow as the creatures approach sexual maturity, and eventually cover the whole face, giving the animals a rounded facial appearance. The white-cheeked macaque also grows dense hair along its neck, while not growing any hair along its short tail. Additionally, there is a distinct difference in the shapes of the genitalia of the two species; contrary to the arrow-shaped structure present in the Assam macaque, the white-cheeked macaque displays a more rounded structure. This was one of the main characteristics that allowed scientists to realize they were dealing with a new species.

== Ecology ==
The white-cheeked macaque has been observed in tropical forests at an altitude of 1395 meters, primary and secondary evergreen broad-leaved forest up to 2420 meters and mixed broadleaf-conifer forests of 2700 meters. The forests in Mêdog, Tibet are protected by Yarlung Zangbo Grand Canyon Nature Reserve. It is thought they live in small multi-male multi-female groups. When the white-cheeked macaque detects the presence of humans it emits a loud high pitched alarm call, flees, and climbs trees. This call is distinct in frequency from the Assam macaque.
