= Schizothorax taliensis =

Conservation status
- Endangered (IUCN 3.1)

Scientific classification
- Kingdom: Animalia
- Phylum: Chordata
- Class: Actinopterygii
- Order: Cypriniformes
- Family: Cyprinidae
- Genus: Schizothorax
- Species: S. taliensis

Binomial name
- Schizothorax taliensis Regan, 1907

Synonyms
- Zacco taliensis (Regan 1907)

Species of fish

Schizothorax taliensis is a species of cyprinid fish. It was described by Charles Tate Regan in 1907. It inhabits Erhai Lake in Yunnan, China, including its tributaries. It has a maximum length of 30 cm (12 in), a common length of about 20 cm (7.9 in), and a maximum published weight of 200 g (0.44 lb).
