= Wa Shan keelback =

Conservation status
- Least Concern (IUCN 3.1)

Scientific classification
- Kingdom: Animalia
- Phylum: Chordata
- Class: Reptilia
- Order: Squamata
- Suborder: Serpentes
- Family: Colubridae
- Genus: Hebius
- Species: H. metusia

Binomial name
- Hebius metusia (Inger, Zhao, Shaffer, & Wu, 1990)

Synonyms
- Amphiesma metusia; Amphiesma metusium; Hebius metusium

Species of snake

The Wa Shan keelback (Hebius metusia) is a species of snake of the family Colubridae.

== Geographic range and conservation status ==
The snake is found in Sichuan, which is a province in China. It is currently endangered by the effects of tourism, and has experienced a decline in habitat quality.
