= Pelophylax tenggerensis =

Conservation status
- Endangered (IUCN 3.1)

Scientific classification
- Kingdom: Animalia
- Phylum: Chordata
- Class: Amphibia
- Order: Anura
- Family: Ranidae
- Genus: Pelophylax
- Species: P. tenggerensis

Binomial name
- Pelophylax tenggerensis (Zhao, Macey & Papenfuss, 1988)
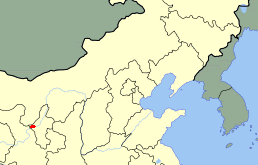

Synonyms
- Rana tenggerensis Zhao, Macey & Papenfuss, 1988

Species of frog

Pelophylax tenggerensis is a species of frog in the family Ranidae. It is endemic to China. It is recorded from Shapotou and Shenjiatan, Yinnan Prefecture, Ningxia Hui Autonomous Region, along the banks of the Yellow River at the edge of the Tengger Desert, China. Common names recorded include Yellow River frog and Yellow River pond frog.

Its natural habitats are temperate grassland, rivers, freshwater marshes, intermittent freshwater marshes, freshwater springs, and arable land. It is threatened by habitat loss.
