= Box turtle =

Common name for several species of land turtle

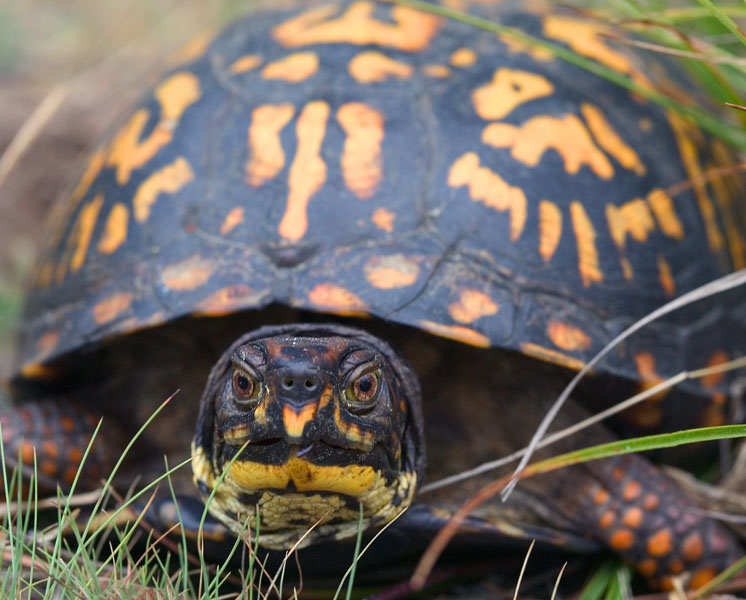
Box turtle (Terrapene carolina carolina).

Box turtle is the common name for several species of land turtle. It may refer to those of the genus Cuora or Pyxidea, which are the Asian box turtles, or more commonly to species of the genus Terrapene, the North American box turtles. They are largely characterized by having a shell shaped like a dome, which is hinged at the bottom, allowing the animal to close its shell tightly to escape predators. Furthermore, the two genera are very different in habitat, behavior and appearance, and are not even classified in the same family. Even though box turtles can be kept as pets, their needs in captivity are complex and the capture of turtles can have serious detrimental effects on the wild population.

The box turtle commonly lives over 20 years, with verified cases of lifespans exceeding 40 to 50 years. There have been unverified cases of box turtles living for 100 years and more.

== Diet ==
Box turtles are omnivorous. Their sharp eyes and keen sense of smell help them find foods such as snails, insects, berries, fungi, slugs, worms, flowers, fish, frogs, salamanders, various rodents, snakes, birds, eggs, among other things. During their first five to six years of life they are primarily carnivorous. Adults tend to be mostly herbivores, but do not feed on leafy greens. Hatchlings and young turtles need more protein and prefer a carnivorous diet, to which, as they grow, they incorporate more and more plants.

== Mating ==
While it appears that most matings of Terrapene carolina occur in one-on-one encounters, there are occasions when two males will compete for access to the same female. These encounters, which almost never amount to mortal combat, consist of head-butting, shoving, and perhaps attempts to overturn the other. It is presumed that eventually one of the males exhausts himself and withdraws from the field while the other gains access to the female. Mating occurs during nesting season beginning in the late boreal spring and ceasing at the end of the summer months.

== Preservation ==
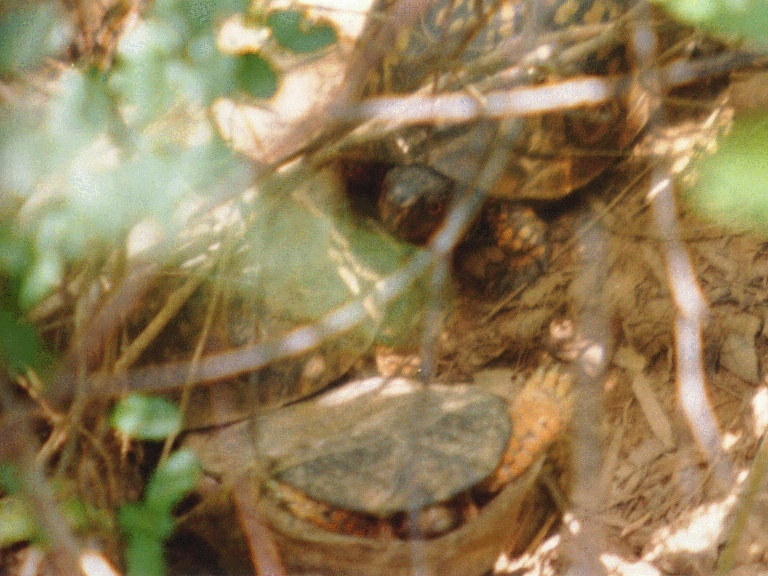
Mating battle of Terrapene carolina

Geographic distribution of the genus Terrapene

Asian box turtles are in serious danger of extinction in their habitat because they are part of the food base of many Asian countries such as China, where they are captured for local food markets despite captive breeding farms. North American box turtles, on the other hand, are endangered by habitat destruction. The forests converted to farmland greatly reduced the number of turtles in many states. The remaining land is often fragmented with highways and urban projects, destroying the animals' habitat. In an attempt to cross man-made additions, turtles are often killed by cars, animals, and other hazards. They are also facing population decline from a necrotizing bacterial infection first found in this species April 2011.

Another serious threat to these animals in North America is the capture and sale of hatchling box turtles from the wild. A 3-year study conducted in Texas indicated that more than 7,000 box turtles were taken from the wild for commercial trade. A similar study in Louisiana found that over a 41-month period, about 30,000 box turtles were taken from the wild for resale. Once captured, the turtles are often kept in poor conditions, in which more than half die. Those that live long enough to be sold usually suffer from conditions such as malnutrition, dehydration, and infection.

Indiana and many other states created strict laws against the collection of hatchling turtles from the wild. In many states it is illegal to keep them without a special permit. Collecting wild-hatched box turtles can cause irreversible damage to populations, because these turtles have a low reproductive rate, as they take a long time to find a mate.

Most turtle and sea-turtle societies do not recommend turtles as pets for young children despite their popularity. Box turtles are easily stressed if touched excessively and require more care than generally thought. They can be easily injured by dogs and cats so special care must be taken to protect them from household pets and neighborhood animals. Box turtles require an enclosed outdoor location, consistent sun exposure and a varied diet. Without this, a turtle's growth can be stunted and its immune system weakened.

Finding box turtles in the wild and taking them as pets, even for a short period, can have detrimental effects. Box turtles want to stay within the area where they were hatched. If one is moved more than half a mile from its territory, it may not find its way back, but may spend years searching for it. This exposes the animal to danger and also disrupts its breeding cycle. While box turtles are very popular as pets, it is important that they are preserved in the right manner.

== Taxonomy ==
=== North American box turtles ===
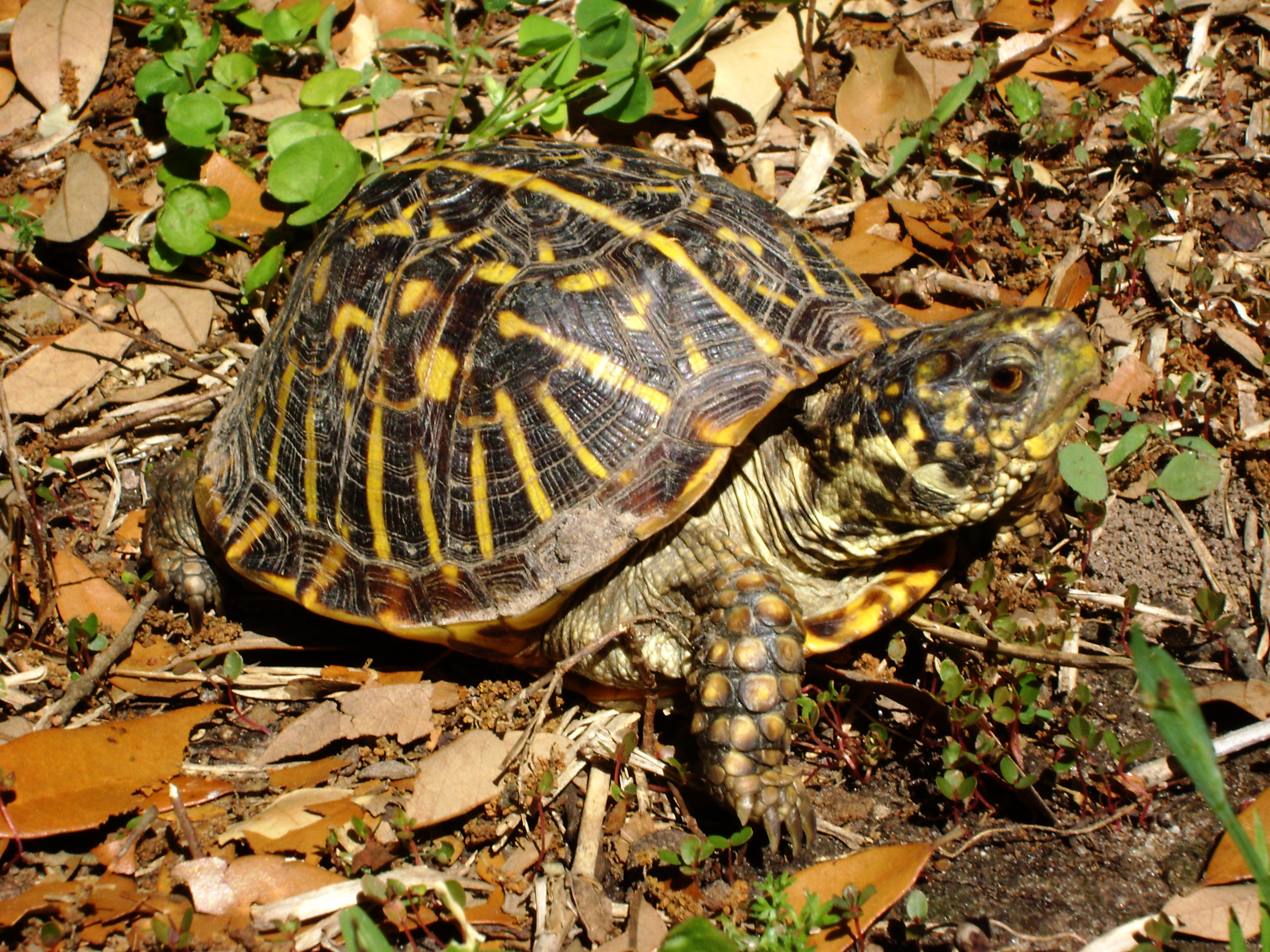
Terrapene ornata.

==== Family Emydidae ====
===== Genus Terrapene =====
- Terrapene carolina
  - Eastern box turtle, Terrapene carolina carolina (Linnaeus, 1758)
  - Florida box turtle, Terrapene carolina bauri (Taylor, 1894)
  - Gulf Coast box turtle, Terrapene carolina major (Agassiz, 1857)
  - Three-toed box turtle, Terrapene carolina triunguis (Agassiz, 1857)
  - Mexican box turtle, Terrapene carolina mexicana (Gray, 1849)
  - Yucatán box turtle, Terrapene carolina yucatana (Boulenger, 1895)
- Coahuilan box turtle, Terrapene coahuila (Schmidt & Owens, 1944)
- Spotted box turtle, Terrapene nelsoni (Stejneger, 1925)
- Terrapene ornata
  - Ornate box turtle, Terrapene ornata ornata (Agassiz, 1857)
  - Desert box turtle, Terrapene ornata luteola (Smith & Ramsey, 1952)

=== Asian box turtles ===
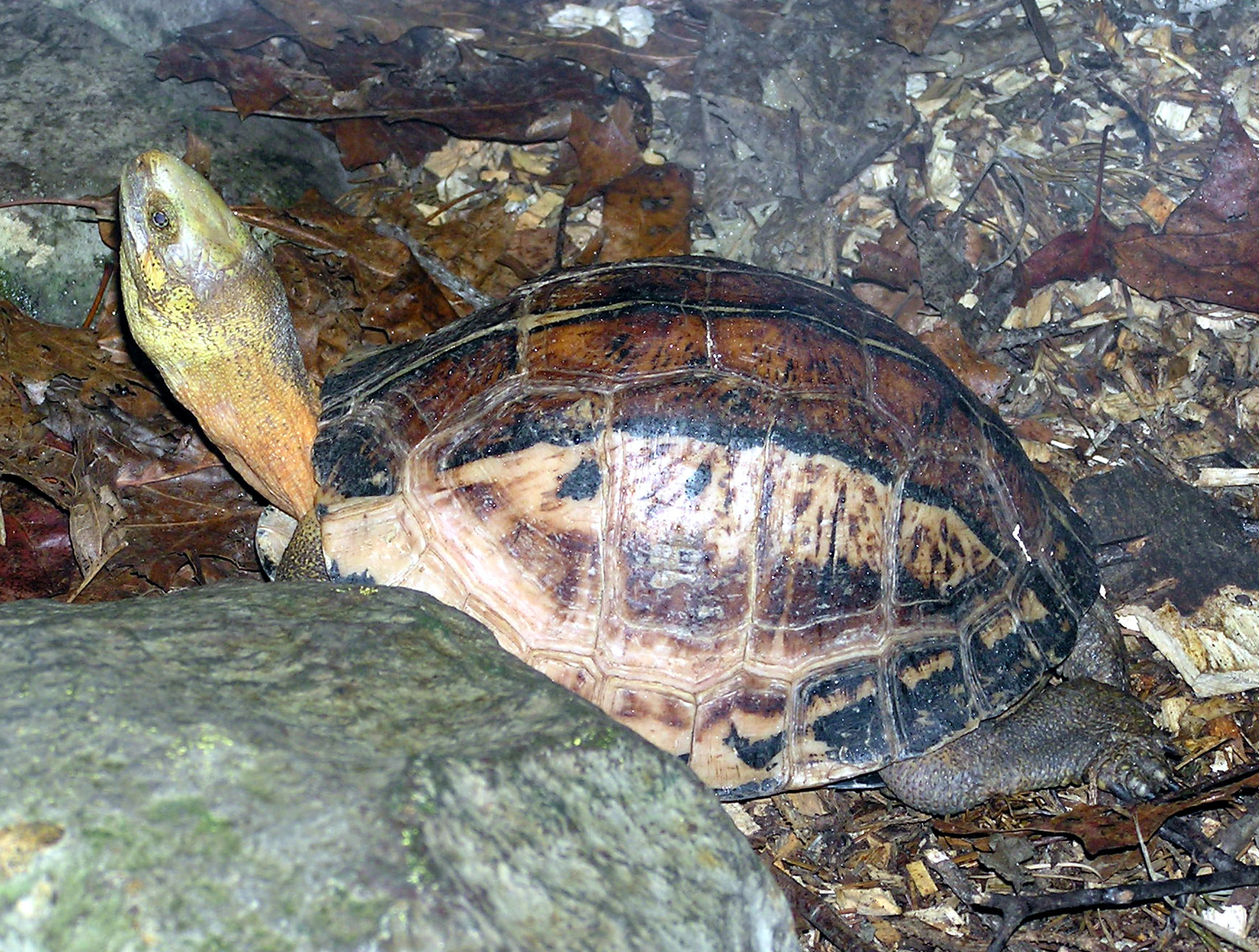
Indo-Chinese box turtle Cuora galbinifrons

==== Family Geoemydidae ====
===== Genus Cuora =====
- Amboina box turtle, Cuora amboinensis (Suckow, 1798)
- Yellow-headed box turtle, Cuora aurocapitata (Luo & Zong, 1988)
- Chinese box turtle, Cuora flavomarginata (Gray, 1863)
- Indochinese box turtle, Cuora galbinifrons (Bourret, 1939)
- McCord's box turtle, Cuora mccordi (Ernst, 1988)
- Pan's box turtle, Cuora pani (Song, 1987)
- Golden coin turtle, Cuora trifasciata (Bell, 1825)
- Yunnan box turtle, Cuora yunnanensis (Boulenger, 1906)
- Zhou's box turtle, Cuora zhoui (Zhao, 1990)

===== Genus Pyxidea =====
- Keeled box turtle, Pyxidea mouhotii (Gray, 1862)
  - Pyxidea mouhotii mouhotii
  - Pyxidea mouhotii obsti

== See also ==
- Turtle
- Tortoise
- Asian box turtle
