= Species Survival Plan =

Plan for survival of endangered species

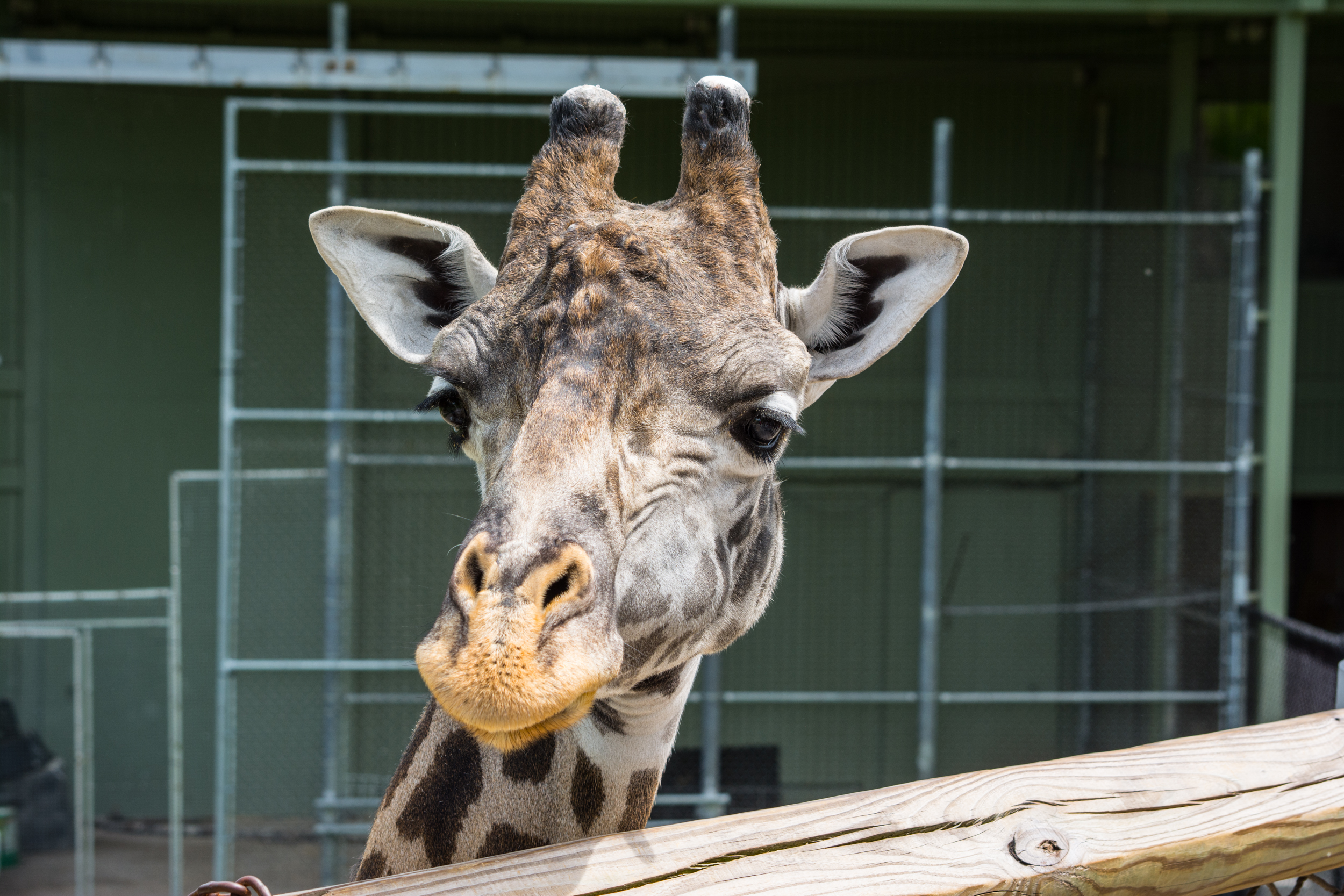
A Masai giraffe located at the Cleveland, Ohio Zoo as part of an SSP program

The American Species Survival Plan (SSP) program was developed in 1981 by the (American) Association of Zoos and Aquariums to help ensure the survival of selected species in zoos and aquariums, most of which are threatened or endangered in the wild.

== SSP program ==
SSP programs focus on animals that are near threatened, threatened, endangered, or otherwise in danger of extinction in the wild, when zoo and zoology conservationists believe captive breeding programs will aid in their chances of survival. These programs help maintain healthy and genetically diverse animal populations within the Association of Zoos and Aquariums-accredited zoo community. AZA accredited zoos and AZA conservation partners that are involved in SSP programs engage in cooperative population management and conservation efforts that include research, conservation genetics, public education, reintroduction, and in situ or field conservation projects. The process for selecting recommended species is guided by Taxon Advisory Groups, whose sole objective is to curate Regional Collection Plans for the conservation needs of a species and how AZA institutions will cooperate to reach those needs. Today, there are almost 300 existing SSP programs. The SSP has been met with widespread success in ensuring that, should a species population become functionally extinct in its natural habitat, a viable population still exists within a zoological setting. This has also led to AZA species reintroduction programs, examples of which include the black-footed ferret, the California condor, the northern riffleshell, the golden lion tamarin, the Karner blue butterfly, the Oregon spotted frog, the palila finch, the red wolf, and the Wyoming toad.

== SSP master plan ==
An SSP master plan is a document produced by the SSP coordinator (generally a zoo professional under the guidance of an elected management committee) for a certain species. This document sets ex situ population goals and other management recommendations to achieve the maximum genetic diversity and demographic stability for a species, given transfer and space constraints.

== See also ==
- European Endangered Species Programme

== List of SSP programs ==
As of 2025, there are 295 species that are a part of the Species Survival Plan program. (Note: While these are called Species Survival Plan programs, some animals on this list are subspecies. Other animal names on this list are not the commonly used name, however they are the official name of their respective SSP program.)

- Aardvark
- Addax
- Agouti, Brazilian
- Alligator, Chinese
- Anaconda, Green
- Anteater, Giant
- Antelope, Roan
- Antelope, Sable
- Aracari, Curl-Crested
- Aracari, Green
- Argus, Great
- Armadillo, Screaming
- Armadillo, Six-banded
- Armadillo, Southern three-banded
- Ass, Somali wild
- Avocet, American
- Babirusa, North Sulawesi
- Baboon, Hamadryas
- Barbet, Red-and-yellow
- Bat, Egyptian fruit
- Bat, Rodrigues fruit
- Bat, Straw-colored fruit
- Bear, Andean spectacled
- Bear, Sloth
- Beaver, American
- Binturong
- Bird-of-paradise, Raggiana
- Bluebird, Fairy
- Boa, Jamaican
- Bongo, Eastern
- Bonobo
- Bushbaby, Mohol
- Cacique, Yellow-rumped
- Callimico
- Capybara
- Cardinal, Red-capped
- Cassowary, Southern (double-wattled)
- Cat, Pallas
- Cat, Sand
- Cheetah
- Chimpanzee
- Chuckwalla, San Esteban
- Cobra, King
- Colobus, Angolan
- Colobus, Guereza
- Condor, Andean
- Coua, Crested
- Crane, Black crowned
- Crane, Demoiselle
- Crane, Grey crowned
- Crane, Red crowned
- Crane, Wattled
- Crane, White-naped
- Curassow, Blue-billed
- Curassow, Helmeted
- Deer, Western tufted
- Dikkop, Spotted
- Dog, African painted
- Dove, Beautiful fruit
- Dove, Black-naped fruit
- Dove, Luzon bleeding heart
- Dove, Mindanao bleeding heart
- Dragon, Komodo
- Duck, Spotted whistling
- Duck, West Indian whistling
- Duiker, Blue
- Duiker, Yellow-backed
- Elephant, African
- Elephant, Asian
- Flamingo, Caribbean
- Flamingo, Chilean
- Flamingo, Greater
- Flamingo, Lesser
- Fossa
- Fox, Bat-eared
- Fox, Fennec
- Fox, Swift
- Frog, Panamanian golden (ahogado)
- Frog, Panamanian Golden (sora)
- Frogmouth, Tawny
- Gazelle, Addra
- Gecko, Giant leaf-tailed
- Gecko, Henkel's leaf-tailed
- Gharial, Sunda
- Gibbon, Lar (white-handed)
- Gibbon, White-cheeked
- Giraffe, Generic
- Giraffe, Masai
- Goose, African pygmy
- Goose, Red-breasted
- Goose, Swan
- Gorilla, Western Lowland
- Guineafowl, Crested
- Hamerkop
- Heron, Boat-billed
- Hippopotamus, Pygmy
- Hippopotamus, River
- Hog, Red River
- Honeyeater, Blue-Faced
- Hornbill, Abyssinian Ground
- Hornbill, Red-Billed
- Hornbill, Rhinoceros
- Hornbill, Southern Ground
- Hornbill, Trumpeter
- Hornbill, Wrinkled
- Horse, Asian Wild
- Hwamei, Chinese
- Hyena, spotted
- Hyrax, Rock
- Ibis, African Sacred
- Ibis, Hadada
- Ibis, Scarlet
- Ibis, Waldrapp
- Iguana, Fiji Banded
- Iguana, Grand Cayman Blue
- Iguana, Jamaican
- Jaguar
- Jay, Plush Crested
- Kangaroo, Red
- Kangaroo, Western Gray
- Kookaburra, Laughing
- Kudu, Lesser
- Langur, Francois'
- Lapwing, Masked
- Lapwing, Spur-Winged
- Laughingthrush, White-Crested
- Leiothrix, Red-Billed
- Lemur, Black and White Ruffed
- Lemur, Collared
- Lemur, Mongoose
- Lemur, Red Ruffed
- Lemur, Ring-Tailed
- Leopard, Clouded
- Leopard, Snow
- Liocichla, Scarlet-Faced
- Lion
- Lizard, Caiman
- Lizard, Chinese crocodile
- Lizard, Rio Fuerte Beaded
- Loris, Pygmy Slow
- Lynx, Canada
- Macaque, Japanese
- Macaw, Blue-Throated
- Macaw, Hyacinth
- Macaw, Red-Fronted
- Magpie, Azure-Winged
- Mandrill
- Mara, Patagonian
- Marmoset, Geoffroy's
- Meerkat
- Merganser, Scaly-Sided
- Monitor, Black Tree
- Monkey, Bolivian Gray Titi
- Monkey, Common Squirrel
- Monkey, DeBrazza's
- Monkey, Mexican Spider
- Monkey, Robust Black Spider
- Monkey, Southern Black Howler
- Motmot, Blue-Crowned
- Muntjac, Reeves'
- Myna, Bali
- Ocelot
- Okapi
- Orangutan, Bornean
- Orangutan, Sumatran
- Oropendola, Crested
- Oryx, Scimitar-Horned
- Otter, Asian Small-Clawed
- Otter, North American River
- Owl, Burrowing
- Owl, Snowy
- Owl, Spectacled
- Panda, red (fulgens)
- Panda, red (refulgens)
- Partridge, Crested Wood
- Peccary, Chacoan
- Pelican, Pink-Backed
- Penguin, African
- Penguin, Chinstrap
- Penguin, Gentoo (ellsworthi)
- Penguin, Humboldt
- Penguin, King
- Penguin, Magellanic
- Penguin, Southern Rockhopper
- Pheasant, Palawan Peacock
- Pheasant, Vietnam
- Pigeon, Green-Naped Pheasant
- Pigeon, Nicobar
- Pigeon, Victoria Crowned
- Pochard, Baer's
- Porcupine, Cape
- Porcupine, Crested
- Porcupine, North American
- Porcupine, Prehensile-Tailed
- Pudu, Chilean (Southern)
- Puffin, Tufted
- Rattlesnake, Aruba Island
- Rattlesnake, Eastern Massasauga
- Rattlesnake, Santa Catalina Island
- Ray, Spotted Eagle
- Rhinoceros, Eastern Black
- Rhinoceros, Greater One-Horned
- Rhinoceros, Southern White
- Ringtail
- Roadrunner, Greater
- Roller, Blue-Bellied
- Saki, White-Faced
- Screamer, Southern
- Sea Lion, California
- Seahorse, Big Bellied
- Seahorse, Lined
- Seal, Harbor
- Seriema, Red-Legged
- Serval
- Shama, White-rumped
- Shark, Sand Tiger
- Shark, Zebra
- Siamang
- Skink, Prehensile-Tailed
- Sloth, Hoffman's Two-Toed
- Sloth, Linne's Two-Toed
- Snake, Eastern Indigo
- Spoonbill, African
- Spoonbill, Roseate
- Squirrel, Prevost's
- Starling, Emerald
- Starling, Golden-Breasted
- Starling, Violet-Backed (Amethyst)
- Stilt, Black-Necked
- Stingray, White-Blotched River
- Stork, Abdim's (White-Bellied)
- Stork, Marabou
- Stork, Saddle-Billed
- Stork, White
- Sunbittern
- Swan, Coscoroba
- Swan, Trumpeter
- Takin, Sichuan
- Tamandua, Southern
- Tamarin, Bearded Emperor
- Tamarin, Cotton-Top
- Tamarin, Golden Lion
- Tanager, Blue-Grey
- Tanager, Silver-Beaked
- Tanager, Turquoise
- Tapir, Malayan (Asian)
- Teal, Marbled
- Tenrec, Lesser Madagascar Hedgehog
- Tern, Inca
- Tiger, Amur
- Tiger, Malayan
- Tiger, Sumatran
- Tortoise, African Pancake
- Tortoise, Brown Forest
- Tortoise, Burmese Black
- Tortoise, Burmese Star
- Tortoise, Egyptian
- Tortoise, Galapagos (microphyes)
- Tortoise, Home's Hinge-back
- Tortoise, Madagascar Flat-Tailed
- Tortoise, Madagascar spider (Common)
- Tortoise, Madagascar spider (Northern)
- Tortoise, Radiated
- Toucan, Keel-Billed
- Toucan, Toco
- Tragopan, Cabot's
- Tree Kangaroo, Matschie's
- Tree Shrew, Northern
- Troupial
- Trumpeter, Grey-Winged
- Turaco, Great Blue
- Turaco, Lady Ross'
- Turaco, Red-Crested
- Turaco, Violaceous
- Turaco, White-Cheeked
- Turtle, Black-Breasted Leaf
- Turtle, Blanding's
- Turtle, Coahuilan Box
- Turtle, Indochinese Box
- Turtle, Malaysian Giant
- Turtle, McCord's Box
- Turtle, Pan's Box
- Turtle, Rote Island Snake-Necked
- Turtle, Spiny
- Turtle, Spotted
- Vulture, Cinereous
- Vulture, King
- Wallaby, Bennett's (Red-necked)
- Wallaby, Tammar
- Wallaroo, Common
- Warthog, Common
- Weaver, White-Headed Buffalo
- Wolf, Maned
- Woodhoopoe, Green
- Zebra, Grevy's
- Zebra, Hartmann's mountain
- Zebra, Plains
