= Box turtle species =

Box turtle species could refer to:

- Species of the North America box turtles of the genus Terrapene
- Species of the Asian box turtles of the genus Cuora.
