= Cuora serrata =

Scientific classification
- Kingdom: Animalia
- Phylum: Chordata
- Class: Reptilia
- Order: Testudines
- Suborder: Cryptodira
- Family: Geoemydidae
- Genus: Cuora
- Species: C. serrata

Binomial name
- Cuora serrata Iverson & Mccord, 1992

Species of turtle

Cuora serrata, originally described as Cuora galbinifrons serrata and later considered a distinct species, are hybrid turtles as shown by genetic studies. These hybrids are bred in the wild (evolution in progress) and were documented for the first time in the wild in 2005, but not in captivity as "novelty" pets as suggested by James Parham and Bryan Stuart, between the keeled box turtle and taxa of the Indochinese box turtle complex. Unnamed hybrids of several other Cuora taxa are also known, as are intergeneric hybrids like Mauremys iversoni (the Fujian pond turtle), a hybrid between Cuora trifasciata and Mauremys mutica which are intentionally produced in Chinese turtle farms.
