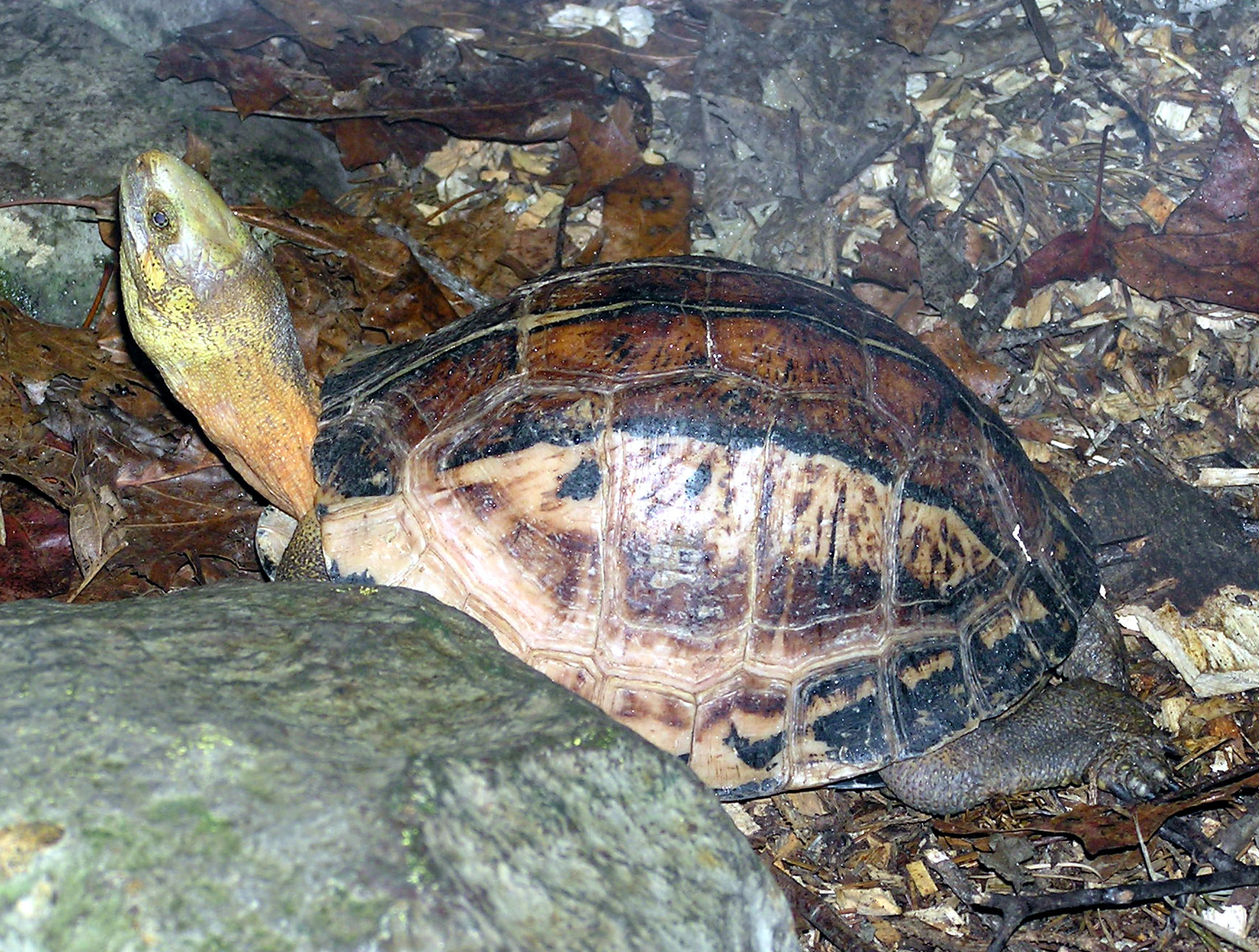
- Southern Vietnamese box turtle Cuora (galbinifrons) picturata

Conservation status
- Critically Endangered (IUCN 3.1)
- CITES Appendix I (CITES)

Scientific classification
- Kingdom: Animalia
- Phylum: Chordata
- Class: Reptilia
- Order: Testudines
- Suborder: Cryptodira
- Family: Geoemydidae
- Genus: Cuora
- Species: C. picturata

Binomial name
- Cuora picturata Lehr, Fritz & Obst, 1998

Synonyms
- Cistoclemmys picturata; Cuora galbinifrons picturata

= Southern Vietnamese box turtle =

Species of turtle

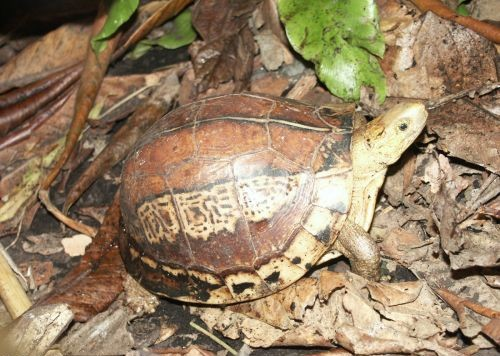

The southern Vietnamese box turtle (Cuora picturata) is endemic to the southern mountainous regions of Vietnam, and possibly also occurring in extreme eastern Cambodia and southern Laos. It is known only from Khanh Hoa and southern Phu Yen provinces, but may also occur in eastern Dak Lak and northern Ninh Thuan provinces.

This species was initially described as a subspecies of Cuora galbinifrons, but was shown to be genetically distinct. This is the same for Cuora galbinifrons bourreti, which is much closely related to Cuora galbinifrons, though, in osteology, genetics and morphology than is Cuora picturata to either one. Thus, this variety probably truly deserves species status.

This species has the highest-domed carapace of all Cuora species, the shape resembling a conquistador helmet. While the head coloration of Cuora galbinifrons subspecies is highly variable even in different populations, this is not the case with C. picturata, whose head is always yellow with a fine, greyish reticulation. They are commonly found in tropical, moist, and broadleaf evergreen forests.

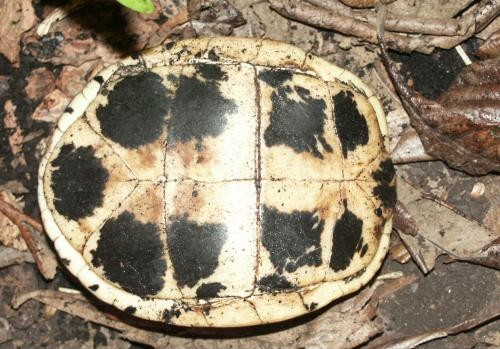
