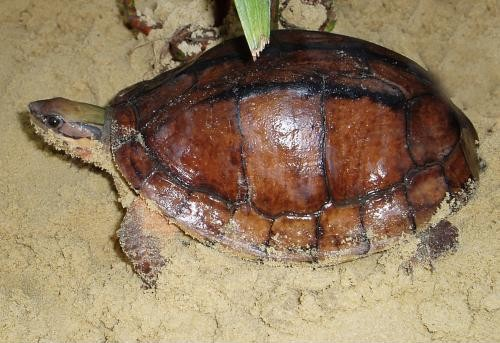

Conservation status
- Critically Endangered (IUCN 2.3)
- CITES Appendix II

Scientific classification
- Kingdom: Animalia
- Phylum: Chordata
- Class: Reptilia
- Order: Testudines
- Suborder: Cryptodira
- Family: Geoemydidae
- Genus: Cuora
- Species: C. cyclornata

Binomial name
- Cuora cyclornata Blanck, Mccord & Le, 2006

= Vietnamese three-striped box turtle =

Species of turtle

The Vietnamese three-striped box turtle or green rice turtle (Cuora cyclornata) is a species of the Southeast Asian genus Cuora (family Geoemydidae). It is distributed from the extreme southern part of the Chinese Guangxi province southwards to central Vietnam and central Laos. This species reaches up to 30 cm straight carapace length and is thus the largest Cuora species. Due to demand of traditional Chinese medicine, this species is nearly extinct in the wild, but is readily bred on Chinese turtle farms. Extremely high prices are paid for this species in China. It can be distinguished from Cuora trifasciata by its larger size and generally more oval or rounder shell, which is usually also flatter, a white, pink, or orange chin, and head coloration with an orange-brownish-olive dorsal head pattern and less black pigment.

== Subspecies ==
Recognized subspecies:

- Central Vietnamese three-striped box turtle (C. c. cyclornata): Occurring in Central Vietnam and adjacent Laos, this subspecies can easily be distinguished from Cuora trifasciata and C. c. meieri by its orange chin, its round carapace appearance, the Cuora mccordi/Boletus-like plastral pattern (i.e. a generally large black blotch extending from the anal scutes to the pectorals, in C. trifasciata and C. c. meieri extending to the gulars) with a thin black vertical black stripe along the pectoral-humeral suture only and two separated, black, longitudinal bars on the gular scutes. This subspecies can reach a carapace length of up to 25 cm; males are smaller than females (as usual in Cuora species).
- Northern Vietnamese or Meiers three-striped box turtle (C. c. meieri): Occurring in extreme southwestern Guangxi Province, China and adjacent northern Vietnam, this subspecies can be differentiated from C. c. cyclornata and C. trifasciata by its oval shell shape, a white to pinkish chin, rounded humeral-pectoral sutures, and a filled Boletus plastral pattern. This subspecies can reach a carapace length of up to 30 cm; males are smaller than females.
- Annamite Vietnamese three-striped box turtle (C. c. annamitica): Occurring in Thanh Hoa Province, Nghe An Province, Ha Tinh Province and northern Quang Binh Province, Vietnam, this subspecies can be differentiated from C. c. cyclornata by its less intense chin coloration, and mainly black plastral front lobe, and can be differentiated from C. c. meieri by chin coloration, shell shape and plastral structure. This subspecies can reach a carapace length exceeding 30 cm.

== Gallery ==
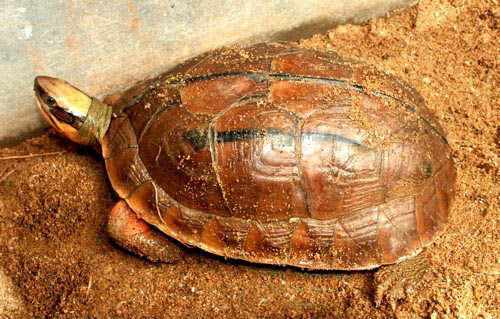
Female C. c. cyclornata

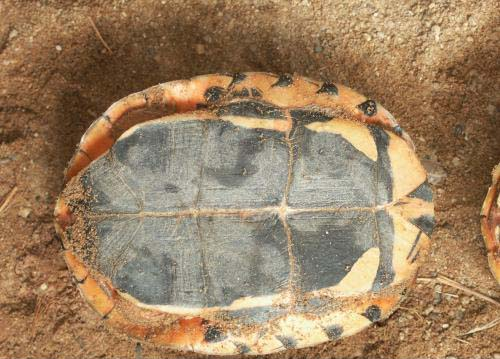
Plastron C. c. cyclornata

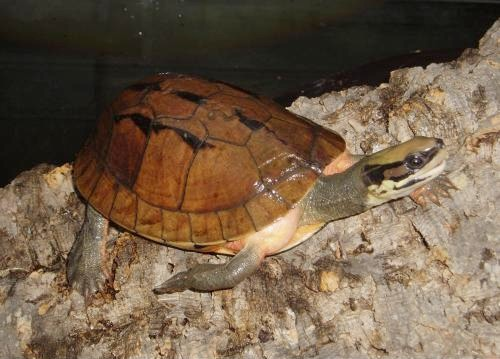
Female C. c. meieri

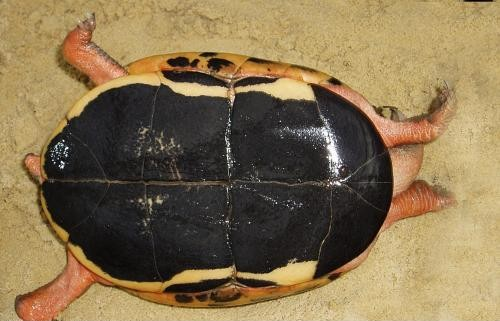
Plastron C. c. meieri

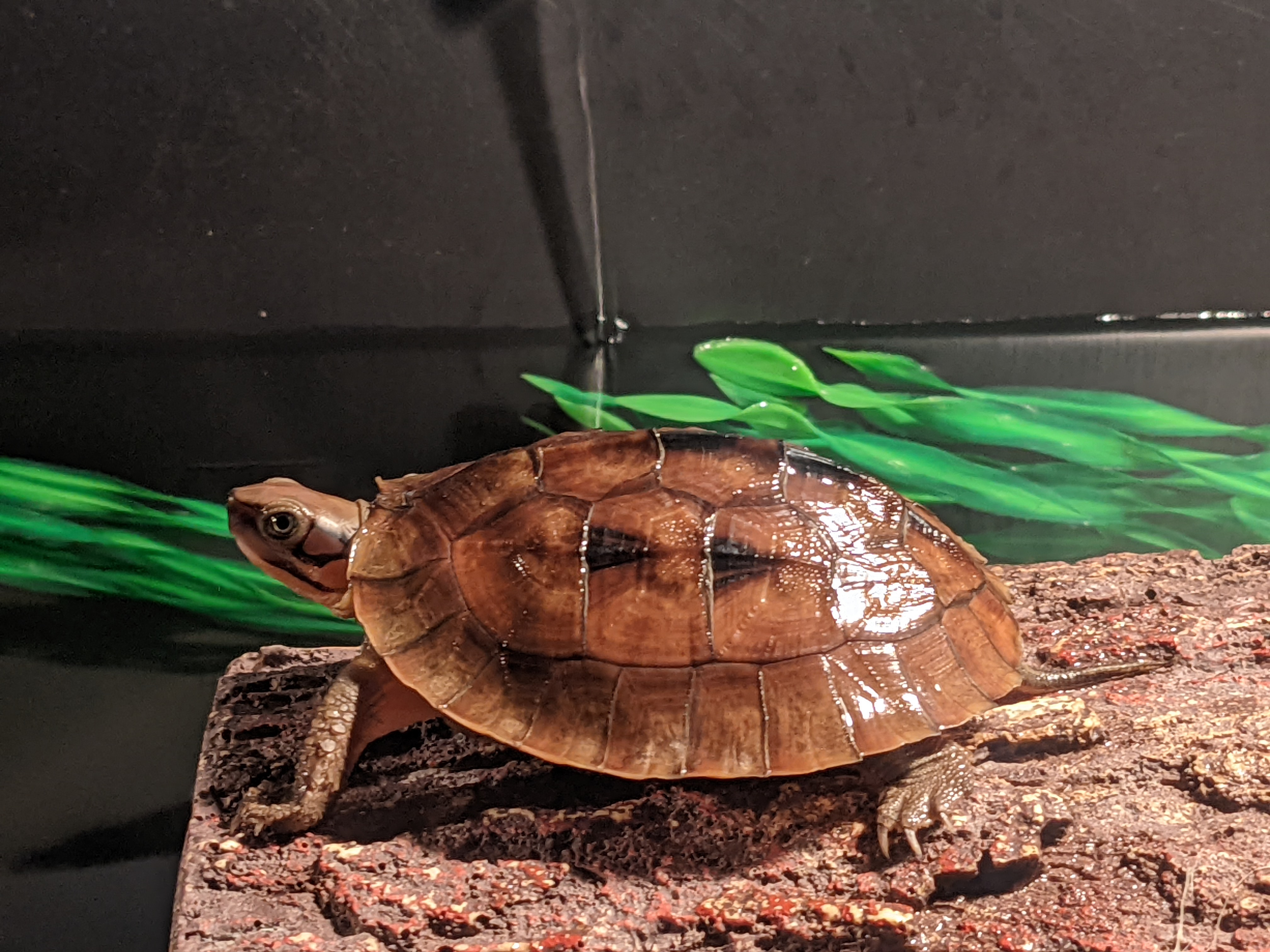
Juvenile C. c. annamitica

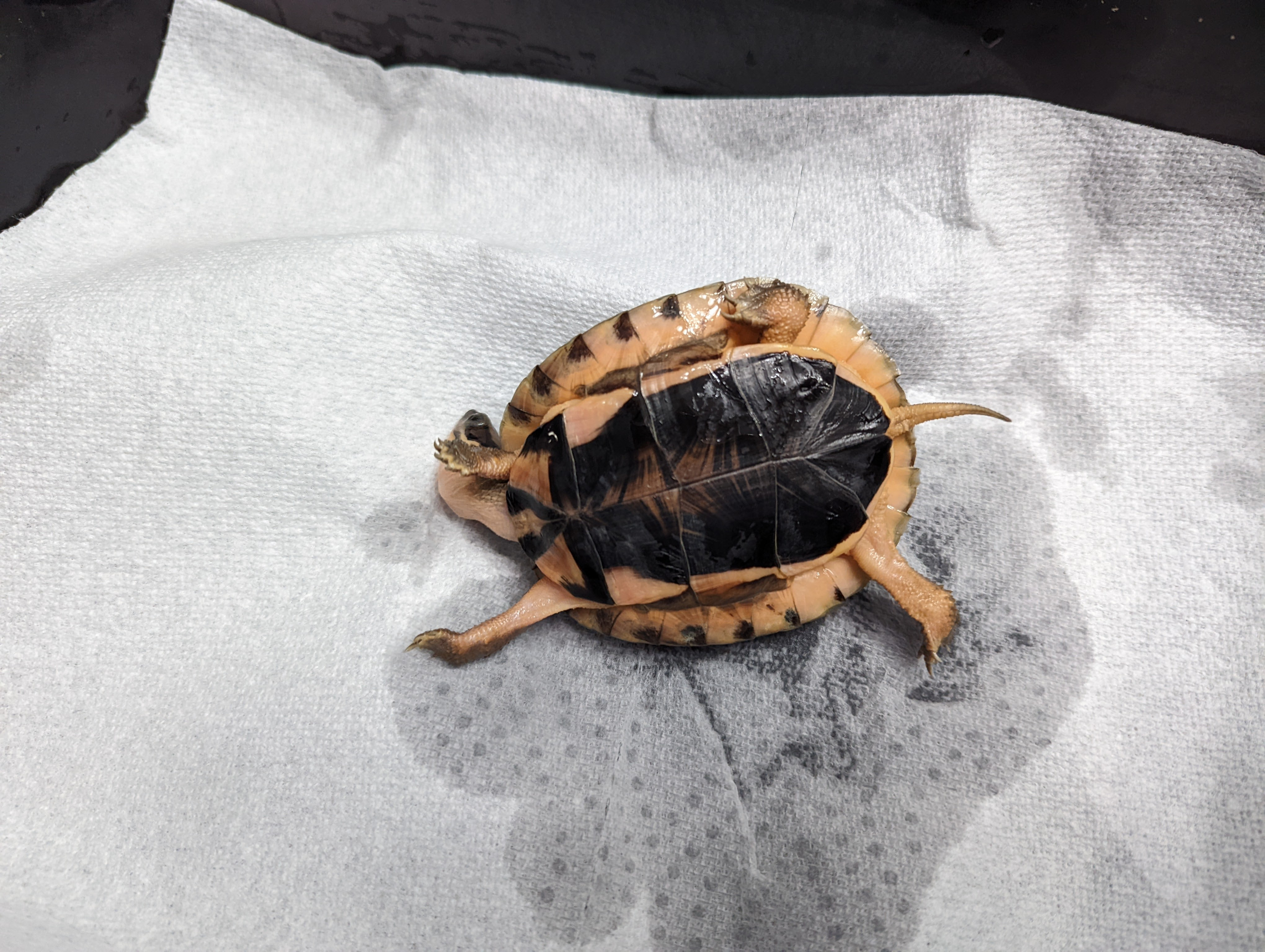
Plastron C. c. annamitica
