= Carl Ernst =

Carl Ernst may refer to:

- Carl H. Ernst (1938–2018), American herpetologist
- Carl W. Ernst (born 1950), American Islamic studies scholar
