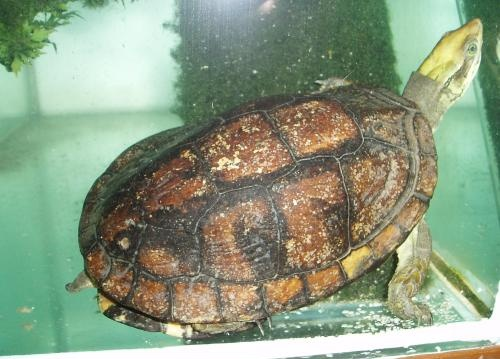
- Pan's box turtle, Cuora pani pani

Conservation status
- Critically Endangered (IUCN 3.1)
- CITES Appendix II

Scientific classification
- Kingdom: Animalia
- Phylum: Chordata
- Class: Reptilia
- Order: Testudines
- Suborder: Cryptodira
- Family: Geoemydidae
- Genus: Cuora
- Species: C. pani

Binomial name
- Cuora pani Song, 1984

Synonyms
- Cuora pani Song, 1984; Cuora chriskarannarum Ernst & McCord, 1987; Cuora chriskarannorum [sic] Obst & Reimann, 1994 (ex errore); Cuora pani pani — Artner, 2003; Pyxiclemmys pani pani — Vetter, 2006

= Pan's box turtle =

Species of turtle

Pan's box turtle (Cuora pani) is a species of turtle in the family Geoemydidae (formerly Bataguridae). The yellow-headed box turtle is sometimes included herein as a subspecies (Cuora pani aurocapitata).

Pan's box turtle is a critically endangered species on the verge of extinction. Each catch of Pan's box turtle rewards upwards of $10,000 per trade (Turtle Conservancy, 2017).

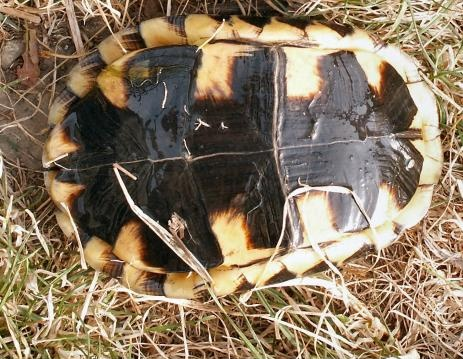
Plastron

== Etymology ==
The specific name, pani, is probably in honor of Chinese herpetologist Pan Lei.

The common name, Pan's box turtle, refers to its ability to seal itself within its shell.

== Geographic range ==
Cuora pani pani, the nominotypical subspecies, is endemic to the central Chinese provinces of Shaanxi, Sichuan, and Hubei (Blanck & Tang, 2005).

== Reproduction ==
Cuora pani is oviparous (The Reptile Database).
