= Roger W. Barbour =

American herpetologist (1919–1993)

Roger William Barbour
- Born: April 5, 1919; Morehead, Kentucky, U.S.
- Died: August 26, 1993; Lexington, Kentucky, U.S.
- Education: Morehead State University; Cornell University
- Known for: Research on the amphibians and reptiles of Kentucky
- Scientific career
- Fields: Herpetology, Vertebrate zoology, Mammalogy
- Workplaces: University of Kentucky
- Author abbrev. (zoology): Barbour

Roger William Barbour (April 5, 1919 – August 26, 1993) was an American vertebrate zoologist, herpetologist, naturalist, and wildlife photographer. His main research interest focused on the amphibians and reptiles of Kentucky.

== Biography ==
Barbour was born in Morehead, Kentucky to John William and Laura (née Hall) Barbour and came from a farming family. He spent most of his youth exploring the nearby hills and forests of his hometown in northeastern Kentucky. At age fifteen, he enrolled at Morehead State Teachers College (now Morehead State University), where he received his Bachelor of Science degree in 1938. His mentor was zoology professor Wilfred A. Welter (1906–1939), who introduced him to the study of ornithology and herpetology; Barbour later named the salamander Desmognathus welteri in his honor in 1950. In December 1938, Barbour married Bernice Lewis, and the couple had one daughter and two sons. In 1939, he earned his Master of Science degree in ornithology at Cornell University under Arthur Augustus Allen. Soon after, he began doctoral studies under Albert H. Wright (1879–1970) at Cornell, which were interrupted by World War II.

While waiting for his military draft, Barbour taught at various colleges in Kentucky. From 1945 to 1946, he served in the United States Army, and upon returning to Cornell, he changed advisors to mammalogist William J. Hamilton, Jr. Barbour completed his Ph.D. in 1949 with a dissertation on the mammals, amphibians, and reptiles of Big Black Mountain in Harlan County, a coal region in southeastern Kentucky.

From 1949 to 1950, Barbour taught natural sciences in Wheeling, West Virginia, before joining the University of Kentucky in Lexington. He served there as an instructor until 1952, assistant professor until 1956, associate professor until 1968, and full professor until his retirement in 1984.

Although primarily a herpetologist and mammalogist, Barbour also wrote extensively on other wildlife topics. His non-herpetological books covered North American bats, Kentucky's shrubs and trees, wildflowers and ferns, mammals, birds, and darters (family Percidae). Between 1940 and 1994, he published more than 90 scholarly articles, 35 of which focused on amphibians and reptiles. His twelve books include Amphibians and Reptiles of Kentucky (1971), Turtles of the United States (1972, with Carl H. Ernst), Snakes of Eastern North America (1989, with Ernst), Turtles of the World (1989, with Ernst), and Turtles of the United States and Canada (1994, with Ernst and Jeffrey E. Lovich). Barbour was also an accomplished nature photographer whose color and black-and-white wildlife and plant photographs appear throughout his works.

== Eponyms ==
In 1989, Fred Kraus and James W. Petranka honored Barbour by naming the salamander species Ambystoma barbouri, which occurs in the Midwestern United States, after him.

== Selected works ==
- with Wayne H. Davis: Bats of America, University Press of Kentucky, Lexington, KY, 1969.
- Amphibians and Reptiles of Kentucky, University Press of Kentucky, Lexington, KY, 1971.
- with Mary E. Wharton: A Guide to the Wildflowers and Ferns of Kentucky, University Press of Kentucky, Lexington, KY, 1971.
- with Carl H. Ernst: Turtles of the United States, University Press of Kentucky, Lexington, KY, 1972.
- with Clell T. Peterson, Delbert Rust, Herbert E. Shadowen, and A. L. Whitt, Jr.: Kentucky Birds: A Finding Guide, University Press of Kentucky, Lexington, KY, 1973.
- with Mary E. Wharton: Trees and Shrubs of Kentucky, University Press of Kentucky, Lexington, KY, 1973.
- with Wayne H. Davis: Mammals of Kentucky, University Press of Kentucky, Lexington, KY, 1974.
- with Robert A. Kuehne: The American Darters, University Press of Kentucky, Lexington, KY, 1983.
- with Carl H. Ernst: Turtles of the World, Smithsonian Institution Press, Washington, D.C., 1989.
- with Carl H. Ernst: Snakes of Eastern North America, George Mason University Press, Fairfax, VA, 1989.
- with Mary E. Wharton: Bluegrass Land and Life: Land Character, Plants, and Animals of the Inner Bluegrass Region of Kentucky, Past, Present, and Future, University Press of Kentucky, Lexington, KY, 1991.
- with Carl H. Ernst and Jeffrey E. Lovich: Turtles of the United States and Canada, Smithsonian Institution Press, Washington, D.C., 1994.
