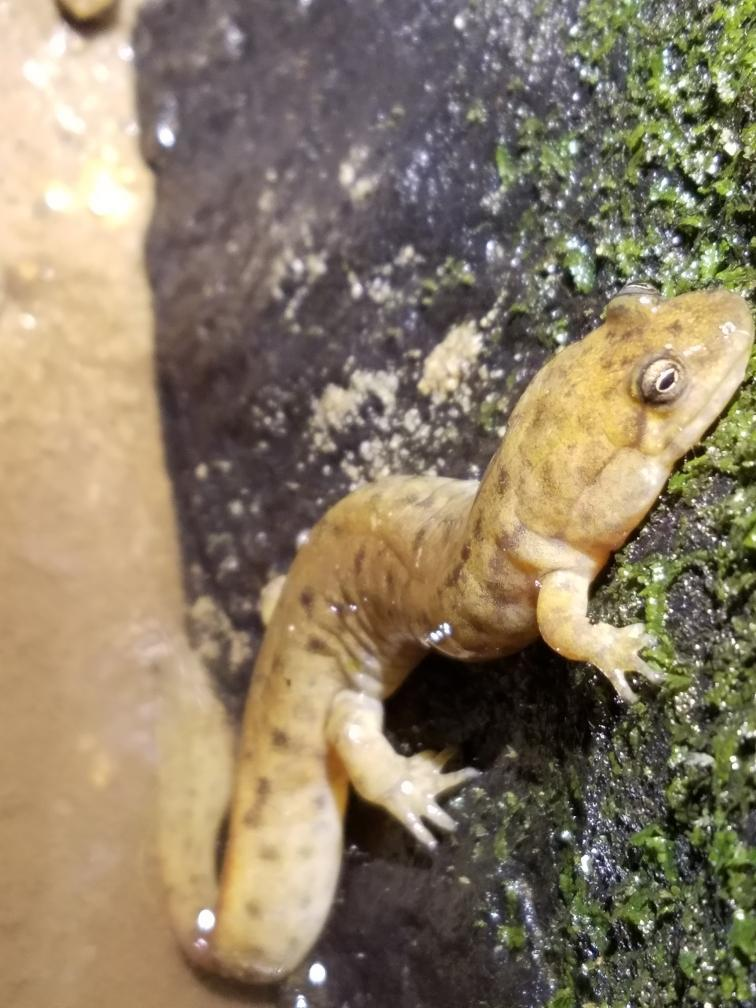
- Desmognathus welteri

Conservation status
- Least Concern (IUCN 3.1)

Scientific classification
- Kingdom: Animalia
- Phylum: Chordata
- Class: Amphibia
- Order: Urodela
- Family: Plethodontidae
- Genus: Desmognathus
- Species: D. welteri

Binomial name
- Desmognathus welteri R. Barbour, 1950

Synonyms
- Desmognathus fuscus welteri R. Barbour, 1950

= Black mountain salamander =

Species of amphibian

The black mountain salamander (Desmognathus welteri) is a species of salamander in the family Plethodontidae.

== Geographic distribution and habitat ==
Desmognathus welteri is endemic to the southern Appalachian Mountains in the south-eastern United States. Its natural habitats are temperate forests, rivers, freshwater marshes and springs.

The black mountain salamander is found in an area of the Appalachian Mountains covering about 20,000 square kilometres (4,900,000 acres). Its range includes eastern Kentucky, southwestern Virginia, and eastern Tennessee. It is found at heights varying from 300 to 1,220 metres (980 to 4,000 ft) above sea level. Its natural habitat is wooded mountainous countryside where it hides under rocks and logs in swift flowing streams, pools, and wet ditches.

It shares the same range as the seal salamander (Desmognathus monticola) and northern dusky salamander (Desmognathus fuscus) which are both more terrestrial, and the blackbelly salamander (Desmognathus quadramaculatus) which shares its aquatic habits.

== Description ==
The black mountain salamander is one of a number of similar looking species of dusky salamanders inhabiting the upland locations in which it is found. It has a robust body about 12 cm (5 in) long with short, stout limbs. The colour is variable but the upper parts are usually pale or medium brown with an indistinct pattern of paler markings. The under side is whitish with dark spots and blotches.

=== Reproduction ===
Courtship behaviour is not known for the black mountain salamander but reproduction takes place in the spring or summer. The female lays clusters of eggs in or just beside small fast flowing streams, in moist crevices, and among wet leaves in the splash zone. About 25 eggs with short stalks are attached to one another like a bunch of grapes. The eggs have large yolks and the larvae develop for some time inside them. The female guards and broods the eggs until they hatch. The larvae are aquatic and usually occupy quiet shallow areas of streams. The larval period lasts twenty to twenty-four months. After metamorphosis, the juveniles seem to occupy rather deeper water than the adults or spend more time on land, perhaps to avoid competition or to avoid encounters with blackbelly salamanders, which are cannibalistic. Black mountain salamanders are believed to mature at four to five years, at a snout to vent length of about 5 centimetres (2.0 in), and have been known to live for twenty years in captivity.

=== Diet ===
The black mountain salamander is very secretive during daytime and may largely forage at night. The diet largely consists of flies, beetles and other insects, and the larvae of flies, butterflies and moths.

== Status ==
The populations of the black mountain salamander seem to be stable or in slight decline although detailed studies have not been performed. The areas in which it occurs are not heavily populated and its habitat is not under threat. Road building and strip mining have caused an increase in silting in some areas, and in West Virginia the salamander is probably now rare.
