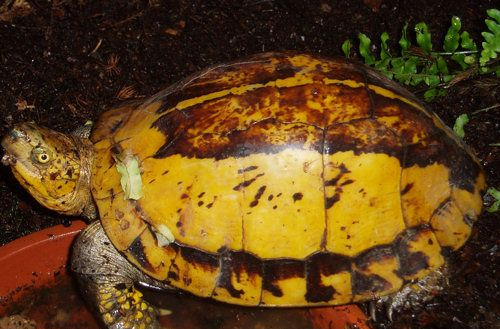
- Northern Vietnamese box turtle Cuora galbinifrons galbinifrons

Conservation status
- Critically Endangered (IUCN 3.1)
- CITES Appendix I (CITES)

Scientific classification
- Kingdom: Animalia
- Phylum: Chordata
- Class: Reptilia
- Order: Testudines
- Suborder: Cryptodira
- Family: Geoemydidae
- Genus: Cuora
- Species: C. galbinifrons

Binomial name
- Cuora galbinifrons Bourret, 1939

Synonyms
- Cuora galbinifrons galbinifrons; Cuora galbinifrons Bourret, 1939; Cyclemus flavomarginata hainanensis Li, 1958; Cuora hainanensis Zhao, 1975; Cyclemys flavomarginata hainanensis Wermuth & Mertens, 1977; Cistoclemmys galbinifrons Bour, 1980; Cistoclemmys hainanensis Iverson, 1985; Cuora flavomarginata hainanensis Obst, 1985; Cistoclemmys flavomarginata hainanensis Groombridge, 1988; Cuora galbinifrons galbinifrons Iverson & McCord, 1992; Cuora galbinifrons hainanensis Iverson & McCord, 1992; Cistoclemmys galbinifrons galbinifrons Bour, 2002; Cistoclemmys galbinifrons hainanensis Bour, 2002; Cuora galbinifrons bourreti: Cuora galbinifrons bourreti Obst & Reimann, 1994; Cistoclemmys galbinifrons bourreti Bour, 2002; Cuora bourreti Stuart & Parham, 2004; Cistoclemmys bourreti Vetter, 2006; Cuora galbinifrons picturata: Cuora galbinifrons picturata Lehr, Fritz & Obst, 1998; Cistoclemmys galbinifrons picturata Bour, 2002; Cuora picturata Stuart & Parham, 2004; Cistoclemmys picturata Vetter, 2006

= Indochinese box turtle =

Species of turtle

The Indochinese box turtle, Vietnamese box turtle, or flowerback box turtle (Cuora galbinifrons) is a species of Asian box turtles from China (Hainan and Guangxi), northern and central Vietnam, Laos, and possibly northeastern Cambodia. It is found in high altitude woodland where it tends to hide in the undergrowth. There is considerable confusion as to the taxonomy of this species with several subspecies being recognised by some authorities. and not by others. The International Union for Conservation of Nature has rated its conservation status as "critically endangered".

== Taxonomy ==
The northern Vietnamese box turtle C. g. galbinifrons was described by Bourret in 1939, but it took nearly 40 years until the first specimens were imported to Europe and the United States. This subspecies occurs in extreme southern Guangxi Province, China, northern Vietnam, and probably northern Laos and on Hainan Island (China). The population from Hainan was once considered to represent a distinct species or at least subspecies, C. (galbinifrons) hainanensis. Li, 1958, was not aware of the description from Bourret (1939) of C. galbinifrons and thus believed to have a new subspecies of Cuora flavomarginata the only Cuora species known at this time with at least some similarities. According to some, specimens from Hainan do not always have fully black plastrons (always the case in mainland C. g. galbinifrons), but sometimes lighter parts. Furthermore, their carapaces show more red pigmentation and brown spots. Genetic and morphologic studies believe it to be a synonym of C.g. galbinifrons, however.

The central Vietnamese flowerback box turtle (Cuora (galbinifrons) bourreti) occurs in central Vietnam and adjacent Laos, and possibly in northeastern Cambodia. The most notable difference to the nominate race is the distinct plastral pattern, where only smaller black blotches (sometimes none at all) occur.

Described as a subspecies of C. galbinifrons, genetic studies have shown it to be quite distinct, possibly to the extent of a separate species, i.e., Cuora bourreti as is the case with Cuora picturata, once also considered a subspecies of C. galbinifrons. However, osteologic studies have shown that C. g. bourreti probably better remains as a subspecies of C. galbinifrons. This is also substantiated by the finding of intergradation zones in north-central Vietnam, where hybrid populations of C. g. galbinifrons and C. g. bourreti are known to exist. The status of C. picturata is uncertain, while this is the morphologically and phenotypically the most distinct variety, authors treat it as a subspecies of C. galbinifrons again. Herein, it is treated as a separate but closely related species.

Specimens of at least the northern and central Vietnamese taxa hybridize—apparently in the wild—with keeled box turtle males to produce the turtles once considered a separate species or subspecies, Cuora serrata.

== Status ==
All populations of Indochinese box turtle are in decline and the conservation situation is made more acute by the diversity of subspecies. Without trying to resolve these taxonomic issues, the International Union for Conservation of Nature has rated the conservation status of the species as "critically endangered".

== Gallery ==
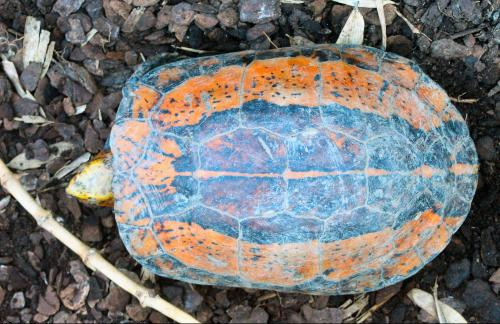
C. g. galbinifrons, dorsal view (Hainan)

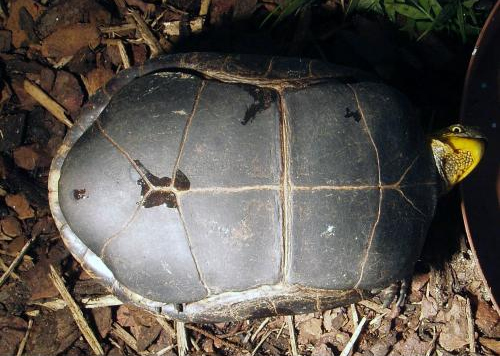
C. g. galbinifrons, plastral view (Vietnam)

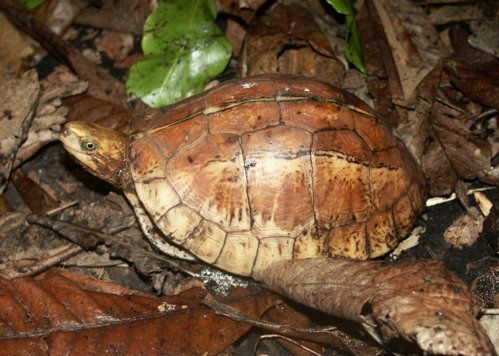
C. g. bourreti, lateral view, light-colored variety (Cambodia/Laos)

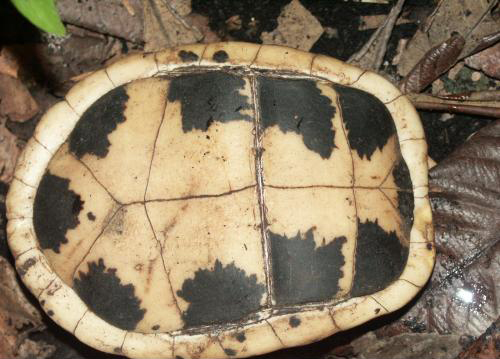
C. g. bourreti, plastral view of the dark-colored Vietnamese variety

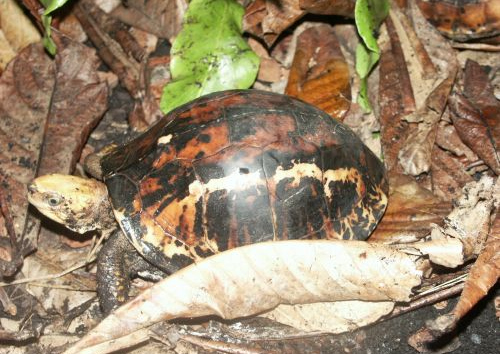
C. g. bourreti, lateral view of the dark-colored Vietnamese variety
