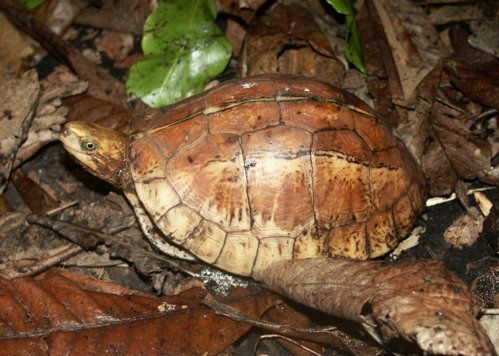

Conservation status
- Critically Endangered (IUCN 3.1)
- CITES Appendix I

Scientific classification
- Kingdom: Animalia
- Phylum: Chordata
- Class: Reptilia
- Order: Testudines
- Suborder: Cryptodira
- Family: Geoemydidae
- Genus: Cuora
- Species: C. bourreti

Binomial name
- Cuora bourreti Obst & Reimann, 1994

Synonyms
- Cuora galbinifrons bourreti Obst & Reimann, 1994; Cistoclemmys galbinifrons bourreti — Bour, 2002; Cuora bourreti — B. Stuart & Parham, 2004; Cistoclemmys bourreti — Vetter, 2006

= Bourret's box turtle =

Species of turtle

Bourret's box turtle (Cuora bourreti), also known commonly as the central Vietnamese flowerback box turtle, is a species of turtle in the family Geoemydidae. The species is endemic to Southeast Asia, only being found in central Vietnam and Savannakhet province, Laos. Due to human exploitation, the species has become critically endangered. Its 2018 IUCN Red List assessment estimated that the population had declined by over 90% in the preceding 60 years, which corresponds to about 3 generations for the turtle.

== Taxonomy ==
The species was first described by Fritz Jürgen Obst and Michael Reimann in 1994, then as a subspecies of the Indochinese box turtle, Cuora galbinifrons. The type locality is Bạch Mã National Park, Huế, Vietnam. The holotype – MNHN-RA 1948.37 – was collected in 1948 and is held by the National Museum of Natural History, France; it was in 2019 thought to have been lost, but has subsequently been relocated. The specific name bourreti is in honor of French René Léon Bourret.

Bryan L. Stuart and James F. Parham elevated the taxon to a species in 2004. Uwe Fritz, Antje Petzold and Markus Auer rejected this elevation in 2006, but subsequent scholarship has upheld it, and as of 2025 the species is recognized by the Turtle Taxonomy Working Group in their annual checklist.

== Description and ecology ==
Bourret's box turtles may attain a straight-line carapace length of 20 cm (7.9 in). Adult females and adult males are about the same size. Hatchlings have a straight-line carapace length of 4.5–5.0 cm (1.8–2.0 in). The species has a generation time of 20 years. The preferred natural habitat of the turtle is forest, at altitudes of 300–1,800 m (980–5,910 ft).

== Status ==
Bourret's box turtle is endemic to central-eastern Indochina, found only in central Vietnam and in Savannakhet province, Laos. In the 1990s the species began to be subjected to intense human exploitation, primarily for consumption but also for the pet trade and the farming/aquaculture industry. The 2018 IUCN Red List assessment of Bourret's box turtle stated that a 90% population decline in over the previous 60 year was "likely an underestimate", and that it was predicted to continue to decline. In the years leading up to the assessment, trade in the species had collapsed, and field studies indicated that it had become rare. The assessment listed the turtle as a critically endangered species.

Conservation efforts at the National Zoo in the United States successfully hatched a pair of Bourret's box turtles on 12 June 2017.

== Gallery ==
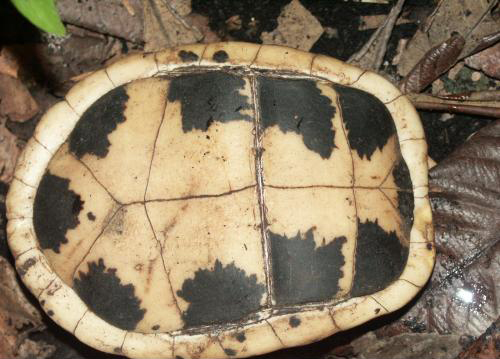

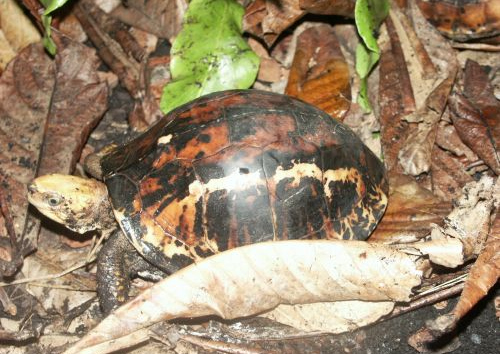

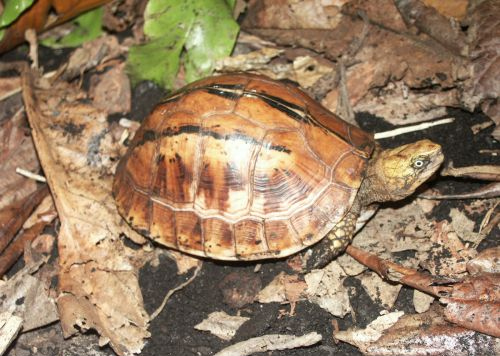
