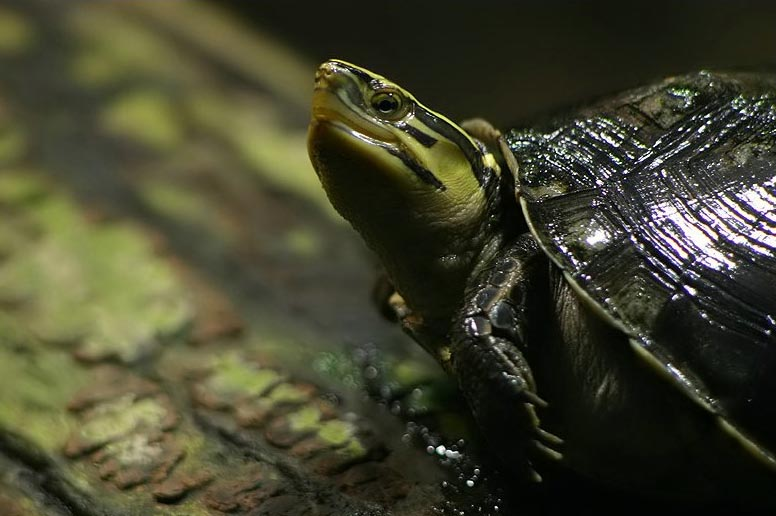
- Amboina box turtle, Cuora amboinensis

Scientific classification
- Kingdom: Animalia
- Phylum: Chordata
- Class: Reptilia
- Order: Testudines
- Suborder: Cryptodira
- Family: Geoemydidae
- Subfamily: Geoemydinae
- Genus: Cuora; Gray, 1856

Species
- About 12

Synonyms
- Cistoclemmys; Pyxiclemmys

= Asian box turtle =

Asian box turtle Temporal range: Late Miocene–present

Genus of land turtles

Asian box turtles are land turtles of the genus Cuora in the family Geoemydidae. About 12 extant species are recognized. The keeled box turtle (Pyxidea mouhotii syn. Cuora mouhotii) is often included in this genus, or separated in the monotypic genus Pyxidea. Genus Cuora is distributed from China to Indonesia and the Philippines, throughout mainland Southeast Asia, and into northern India and Bhutan.

== Description ==
Cuora species are characterized by a low- (e.g. Cuora pani) to high- (e.g. Cuora picturata) domed shell, which usually has three keels on the carapace. They are reddish, yellowish, brown, grey, and/or black in color. Some species have bright yellow, black, orange, or white stripes down the length of their keels. Their body color is highly variable and typically very bright. Most species show stripes of variable color down either side of their head that usually meet at the nose.

== Background ==
Asian box turtles are the most heavily trafficked turtles in the world. They are captured and sold as food to China and to the United States as pets. Nancy Karraker, a University of Rhode Island associate professor, has said "Trafficking in turtles is a major issue in Southeast Asia, and it's important that we understand the key ecological roles that species like this box turtle play before it's too late".

Different conservation organizations are taking action to prevent or slow down the extinction of these species, but in the past, most of the efforts failed due to lack of biological research regarding the history or genetic diversity of these species.

== Behavior ==
Asian box turtles are terrestrial, semiaquatic, or mainly aquatic. They typically spend much of their time on the edge of shallow swamps, streams, or ponds that are dense with vegetation. Most are omnivorous, but carnivorous diets do occur.

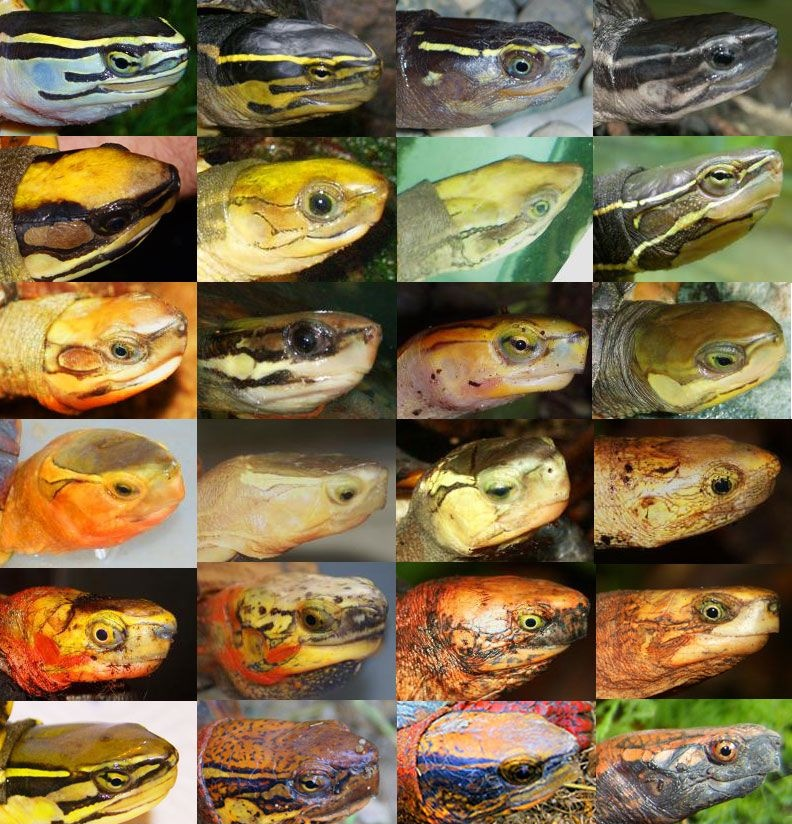
Head portrait of the different Cuora species, subspecies and varieties (from left to right/top to bottom): Cuora amboinensis amboinensis (Sulawesi), Cuora amboinensis kamaroma (Thailand), Cuora amboinensis ssp. (unknown), Cuora amboinensis ssp. (Philippines); Cuora trifasciata (Guangdong, China), Cuora aurocapitata (Anhui, China), Cuora pani pani (Shaanxi, China), Cuora yunnanensis (Yunnan, China); Cuora cyclornata cyclornata (Annam, central Vietnam), Cuora cyclornata meieri (north Vietnam), Cuora mccordi (Guangxi, China), Cuora zhoui (unknown); Cuora flavomarginata sinensis (Sichuan, China), Cuora flavomarginata evelynae (Ryukyu Islands, Japan), Cuora flavomarginata flavomarginata (Taiwan), Cuora picturata (southern Annam, south Vietnam); Cuora galbinifrons galbinifrons (north Vietnam), Cuora galbinifrons galbinifrons (Hainan, China); Cuora bourreti (Annam, central Vietnam), Cuora bourreti (Laos); Cuora cyclornata cyclornata × Cuora amboinensis kamaroma hybrid, Cuora cyclornata × Pyxidea mouhotii, Cuora trifasciata × Pyxidea mouhotii, Cuora galbinifrons × Pyxidea mouhotii = "Cuora serrata"

== Taxonomy and systematics ==
Listed alphabetically by binomial name, the following species are recognized by the Turtle Taxonomy Working Group as of 2025:

- Amboina box turtle or East Indonesian box turtle, C. amboinensis (two subspecies)
  - Moluccas box turtle, C. a. amboinensis
  - Sulawesi box turtle, C. a. aurantiae
- Southeast Asian box turtle, C. couro (two subspecies)
  - West Indonesian box turtle, C. c. couro
  - Malayan box turtle or domed Malayan box turtle, C. c. kamaroma
- Yellow-headed box turtle or golden-headed box turtle, Cuora aurocapitata (two subspecies)
  - Eastern yellow-headed box turtle, C. a. aurocapitata
  - Western yellow-headed box turtle, C. a. dabieshani
- Bourret's box turtle, C. bourreti
- Vietnamese three-striped box turtle or green rice turtle, Cuora cyclornata (three subspecies)
  - Central Vietnamese three-striped box turtle, C. c. annamitica
  - Southern Vietnamese three-striped box turtle, C. c. cyclornata
  - Northern Vietnamese three-striped box turtle, C. c. meieri
- Chinese box turtle, yellow-margined box turtle, or golden-headed turtle, C. flavomarginata (two subspecies)
  - Yellow-margined box turtle, C. f. flavomarginata
  - Ryukyu yellow-margined box turtle, C. f. evelynae
- Indochinese box turtle, Vietnamese box turtle or flowerback box turtle, C. galbinifrons
- Burmese box turtle, C. lineata
- McCord's box turtle, C. mccordi
- Keeled box turtle, C. mouhotii (two subspecies)
  - Northern keeled box turtle, C. m. mouhotii
  - Southern keeled box turtle, C. m. obsti
- Pan's box turtle, C. pani
- Southern Vietnamese box turtle, C. picturata
- Philippine box turtle, C. philippinensis
- Assam box turtle, C. praschagi
- Golden coin turtle or Chinese three-striped box turtle, C. trifasciata (two subspecies)
  - Hainan three-striped box turtle, C. t. luteocephala
  - Chinese three-striped box turtle, C. t. trifasciata
- Yunnan box turtle, C. yunnanensis - rediscovered in 2004, verified in 2007
- Zhou's box turtle, C. zhoui = "C. pallidicephala"

Cuora serrata, originally described as C. galbinifrons serrata by Iverson & Mccord and later considered a distinct species, is a hybrid of the keeled box turtle and taxa of the Indochinese box turtle complex as shown by the genetic studies of Parham et al. and Stuart & Parham (2004). A single specimen of C. serrata has been found in the wild, lending credence to the possibility that other specimens arose through natural hybridization or even from wild populations. No Chinese turtle farm is known to produce C. serrata-like specimens. The occurrence of wild hybrids is often regarded as "evolution in progress", a terminology and point of view that is not always accepted. It has yet to be confirmed whether all C. serrata from the wild originated by direct hybridization of C. mouhotii and C. galbinifrons, or also by "hybridisation" of C. serrata × C. serrata.

Unnamed hybrids of several other Cuora taxa are also known, (Note: See Vetter & Van Dijk (2006).) as are intergeneric hybrids such as Mauremys iversoni, a hybrid between Cuora trifasciata and Mauremys mutica, which is intentionally produced in Chinese turtle farms.

=== Fossil species ===
- †Cuora chiangmuanensis (Late Miocene of Thailand)
- †Cuora miyatai (Middle Pleistocene of Japan)
- †Cuora pitheca (Late Miocene of China)
- †Cuora tungia (Lower Pleistocene of China)

== In captivity ==
Wild-caught C. amboinensis specimens were frequently available in the exotic animal trade, but are getting rarer now; other species are rare to commercially extinct.

== See also ==
- Box turtle
