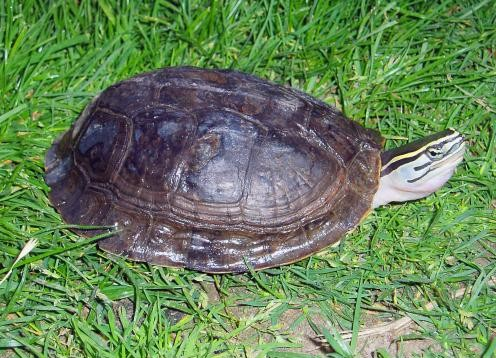
- Adult C. a. amboinensis from Sulawesi

Conservation status
- Endangered (IUCN 3.1)
- CITES Appendix II

Scientific classification
- Kingdom: Animalia
- Phylum: Chordata
- Class: Reptilia
- Order: Testudines
- Suborder: Cryptodira
- Family: Geoemydidae
- Genus: Cuora
- Species: C. amboinensis

Binomial name
- Cuora amboinensis Daudin, 1802

Synonyms
- Cuora amboinensis amboinensis: Testudo amboinensis Daudin, 1801; Testudo melanocephala Daudin, 1801; Emys amboinensis Schweigger, 1812; Emys melanocephala Schweigger, 1812; Terrapene amboinensis Merrem, 1820; Kinosternon amboinense Bell, 1825 (ex errore); Cistuda amboinensis Gray, 1830; Clemmys (Clemmys) melanocephala Fitzinger, 1835; Cuora amboinensis Gray, 1856; Cistudo amboinensis Boulenger, 1889; Cyclemys amboinensis Boulenger, 1889; Cuora ambionensis Goldsmith, Proctor, Cole & Dadd, 1969 (ex errore); Cuora amboiensis Nutaphand, 1979 (ex errore); Cuora amboinensis amboinensis Rummler & Fritz, 1991; Cuora amboinensis couro: Emys couro Schweigger, 1812; Terrapene bicolor Bell, 1825; Terrapene couro Fitzinger, 1826; Emys cuoro Mertens & Wermuth, 1955 (ex errore); Cuora amboinensis couro Rummler & Fritz, 1991; Cuora amboinensis cuoro Das, 1995; Cuora amboinensis kamaroma: Terrapene bicolor Bell, 1825; Cuora amboinensis kamaroma Rummler & Fritz, 1991; Cuora amboinensis kanzaroma Artner, 2003 (ex errore); Cuora amboinensis lineata: Cuora amboinensis lineata McCord & Philippen, 1998

= Amboina box turtle =

Species of turtle

The Amboina box turtle or Southeast Asian box turtle (Cuora amboinensis) is a species of Asian box turtle widely distributed across Southeast Asia. It is native to the Asian mainland from northeast India, through Bangladesh, Burma and Thailand, across Laos, Cambodia, Vietnam, and Malaysia. It is also found on the archipelagos of Indonesia and the Philippines.

The type locality is "Amboine" (or "Amboina") Island, today Ambon Island in Indonesia.

== Description ==
These turtles have blackish-brown to olive-brown shells that are not as ornate as many other box turtles. All have a blackish olive head with three yellow stripes on the side. They are relatively small turtles, ranging in length between 200-250mm depending on subspecies and sex. Females are slightly larger than males. The male can be identified by the slightly concave shape to its plastron. There is no specific pattern to what the underbellies may look like, for either sex. Life expectancy is 25–30 years. The only true way of telling age is to guess by the texture of the shell, as growth rings form irregularly.

== Distribution and habitat ==
The Amboina box turtle is widely distributed across Southeast Asia. Its range extends on the Asian mainland from northeast India, through Bangladesh, Burma and Thailand, across Laos, Cambodia, Vietnam, and Malaysia. It is also found on the archipelagos of Indonesia and the Philippines. The Amboina prefers lowland freshwater habitats from sea level up to about 500 meters and can be found in both natural and human-modified landscapes. It prefers still or slow-moving waters with a soft bottom including ponds, creeks, marshes, rice paddies, irrigation canals and drainage ditches. They are semi-aquatic and tend to spend more time on land at night; the young are more aquatic than adults. Amboina turtles do not migrate but individuals may wander substantial distances during their lifetime.

== Ecology and behavior ==
The Amboina is omnivorous but tends toward a more vegetarian diet. On land it eats plants, fruits, seeds, fungi and worms; in the water it consumes plants, insects and mollusks. The species has been observed to contribute to seed dispersal for fig trees and other tropical plants.

Mating takes place between November and April after a brief courtship ritual. Typically, the female will lay three small clutches of two eggs each year and incubation may take anywhere from 70 to 100 days. Eggs are elongate, brittle and hard-shelled. The variability in clutch size, egg size and egg-laying season relate to geographic variability and climate.

== Taxonomy ==
There are four subspecies that are primarily differentiated by differences in the color and shape of the carapace:

- Cuora amboinensis amboinensis (Wallacean box turtle) – eastern Indonesian islands: Ambon Island, Sulawesi, the Moluccas, Buru, Seram, and East Timor, and other small islands in the region.

Has a quite flat shell with flared marginal scutes. The plastron has bigger black spots, and it possesses a bigger head; well adapted for an aquatic lifestyle. For individuals suspected to be of this subspecies: Ratio of carapace length / height: 3.08. Average ratio dimensions of plastron spots: 1.21 (almost circular)

- Cuora amboinensis couro (West Indonesian box turtle) (Schweigger, 1812) – south Indonesian islands: Sumatra, Java, Bali and Sumbawa.

Moderately domed carapace, some individuals possess flared marginal scutes. The plastron shows black markings on every plastral scute. Darker in coloration, more oval black spots on the plastron.

- Cuora amboinensis kamaroma (Malayan box turtle or domed Malayan box turtle) Rummler & Fritz, 1991 Mainland Indochina (South and Central Vietnam, southern Laos and Cambodia), Thailand (Phang Nga Province, etc.), Singapore and mainland Malaysia and Borneo.

High domed carapace and smaller, more elongated plastron with less black spots than the other subspecies. It has a smaller and shorter tail compared to the other subspecies and does not have any flares in the marginal scutes. Average ratio of carapace length / height: 2.82. Average ratio dimensions of plastron spots: 2.14 (small and elongated)

- Cuora amboinensis lineata (Burmese box turtle) McCord & Philippen, 1998 – Myanmar.

Resembles Cuora amboinensis kamaroma, but in the carapace there is a bright colored mid-dorsal line, and sometimes a bright colored lateral line. The plastral scutes possess large black spots similar to Cuora amboinensis couro.

Several distinct populations are believed to represent up to four more subspecies, or at least striking varieties.

- the Nicobar Islands
- East India (Assam), Bangladesh, and possibly Sri Lanka
- Borneo, the Malaysian islands, Brunei, and Palawan
- the Philippines (Leyte, Luzon, Mindanao, Samar, Negros, Panay, etc.)

C. a. kamaroma has hybridized in captivity with the Vietnamese pond turtle – a species nearly extinct in the wild – and with males of the Chinese pond turtle (Chinemys reevesii). Other hybrids are known, like C. amboinensis × Cuora trifasciata.

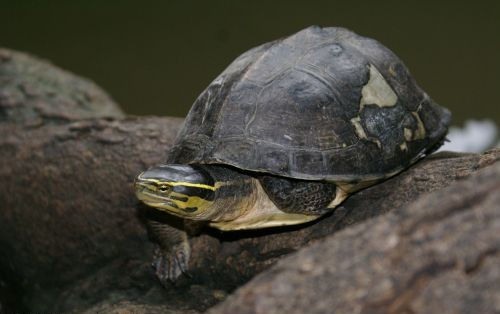
C. a. kamaroma from Thailand

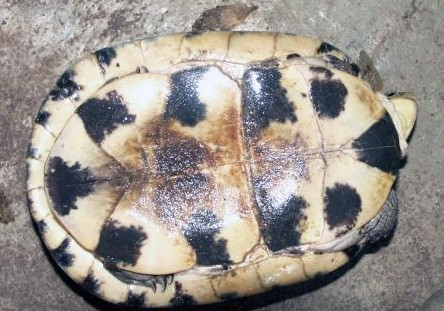
Plastron of C. a. kamaroma

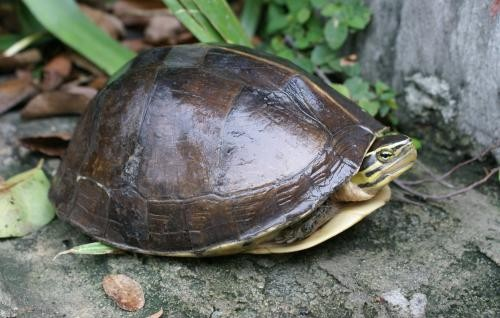
C. a. lineata from Myanmar

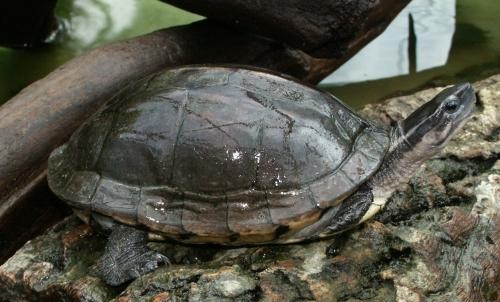
C. amboinensis "Philippines population" from Leyte

== Conservation status ==
Once common across much of its range, the Amboina box turtle has undergone a rapid population decline in many areas. In 2020 it was classified as Endangered by the IUCN. The primary threat is capture for local consumption, export to China for food and traditional medicine, and export for the pet trade in the United States and Europe. Although it is adaptable to human-modified landscapes, habitat destruction is still considered a threat in some areas.
