= Carl H. Ernst =

American herpetologist (1938–2018)

- Born: Carl Henry Ernst; September 28, 1938; Lancaster, Pennsylvania, U.S.
- Died: November 3, 2018 (aged 80)
- Education: Millersville University of Pennsylvania (B.S.); West Chester University (M.Ed.); University of Kentucky (Ph.D.)
- Known for: Research on turtles and snakes
- Scientific career
- Fields: Herpetology
- Workplaces: George Mason University; Smithsonian Institution
- Thesis: Natural history and ecology of the painted turtle, Chrysemys picta (Schneider) (1969)
- Author abbrev. (zoology): Ernst

Carl Henry Ernst (September 28, 1938 – November 3, 2018) was an American herpetologist. His research focused on turtles and snakes.

== Biography ==
Ernst was the son of George Henry and Evelyn Mae Ernst (née Schlotzhauer). He grew up in the seventh district of Lancaster, Pennsylvania, and graduated from J.P. McCaskey High School in 1956. He earned his Bachelor of Science from the Millersville University of Pennsylvania in 1960, and in 1963 received his Master of Education from West Chester University. In 1969 he completed his Ph.D. in vertebrate zoology at the University of Kentucky with the dissertation Natural history and ecology of the painted turtle, Chrysemys picta (Schneider). That same year he married Evelyn Marie Chasteen, an information center director at the National Science Resource Center. They had two daughters.

Ernst began teaching biology in 1960 at Hempfield High School, where he also coached wrestling until 1966. From 1967 to 1969, he was an assistant professor of biology at Elizabethtown College. Between 1964 and 1968, he worked as a teaching assistant in vertebrate zoology and from 1967 to 1969 he was curator of the vertebrate collection at the University of Kentucky. From 1969 to 1972, he was assistant professor of biology at Southwest Minnesota State University. In 1972 he joined George Mason University in Fairfax, Virginia, where he served as associate professor until 1978 and as full professor of biology from 1978 to 2003. He retired as professor emeritus in 2004. At George Mason he taught courses in vertebrate zoology and ecology, chaired the Department of Environmental Science and Policy, and supervised the graduate work of 51 master’s and 20 doctoral students. In 1986, he was named Distinguished Professor of Herpetology.

From 1972 to 2016, Ernst was a research associate in the Department of Amphibians and Reptiles at the Smithsonian Institution. A prolific researcher, he published more than 240 scientific papers and wrote eleven books, including four with his colleague Roger W. Barbour and four with his wife.

Ernst described several taxa, including McCord's box turtle (Cuora mccordi), the subspecies Rhinoclemmys pulcherrima rogerbarbouri of the painted wood turtle, Platemys platycephala melanonota of the twist-necked turtle, Cuora flavomarginata evelynae of the yellow-margined box turtle, and Platysternon megacephalum shiui of the big-headed turtle. In 1987, with Brent B. Nickol, he also described the acanthocephalan species Neoechinorhynchus lingulatus, a parasite of the Florida red-bellied cooter.

== Eponymy ==
In 1992, Jeffrey E. Lovich and Clarence John McCoy named the Escambia map turtle (Graptemys ernsti) in his honor.

== Selected works ==
- with Roger W. Barbour: Turtles of the United States. University Press of Kentucky, Lexington, 1972.
- with Roger W. Barbour: Snakes of Eastern North America. George Mason University Press, Fairfax, Virginia, 1989.
- with Roger W. Barbour: Turtles of the World. Smithsonian Institution Press, Washington, D.C., 1989.
- Venomous Reptiles of North America. Smithsonian Institution Press, Washington, D.C., 1992.
- with Roger W. Barbour and Jeffrey E. Lovich: Turtles of the United States and Canada. Smithsonian Institution Press, Washington, D.C., 1994.
- with George Robert Zug: Snakes in Question: The Smithsonian Answer Book. Smithsonian Institution Press, Washington, D.C., 1996. Revised 2004 as Snakes: Smithsonian Answer Book.
- with Evelyn M. Ernst: Snakes of the United States and Canada. Smithsonian Books, Washington, D.C., 2003.
- with Evelyn M. Ernst: Synopsis of Helminths Endoparasitic in Snakes of the United States and Canada. Society for the Study of Amphibians & Reptiles, 2006.
- with Robert P. Reynolds and Steve W. Gotte: Catalog of Type Specimens of Recent Crocodilia and Testudines in the National Museum of Natural History. Smithsonian Institution Scholarly Press, Washington, D.C., 2007.
- with Evelyn M. Ernst: Venomous Reptiles of the United States, Canada, and Northern Mexico. Johns Hopkins University Press, Baltimore, Vol. 1 (2011), Vol. 2 (2012).

== General references ==
- Carl Henry Ernst. In: American Men & Women of Science: A Biographical Directory of Today's Leaders in Physical, Biological, and Related Sciences. Gale, 2008
- Carl H. Ernst: Biographical Sketch and Bibliography of Carl H. Ernst. In: Smithsonian Herpetological Information Service, No. 150, Division of Amphibians & Reptiles, National Museum of Natural History, Smithsonian Institution, 2016. ISSN 2331-7515
- Dr. Carl H. Ernst 1938–2018. In: Catesbeiana – Journal of the Virginia Herpetological Society. Vol. 39, No. 1, Spring 2019, pp. 26–27. ISSN 0892-0761
- Jeffrey E. Lovich: Carl H. Ernst 1938–2018. In: Herpetological Review 50(1), 2019, pp. 209–211
