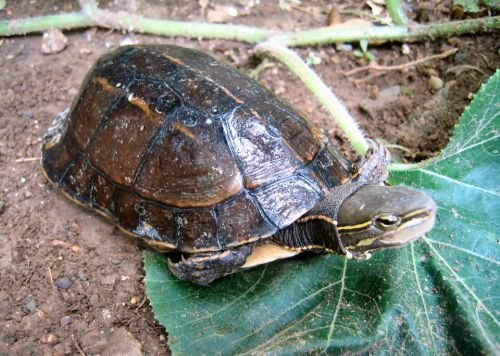

Conservation status
- Critically Endangered (IUCN 3.1)
- CITES Appendix II

Scientific classification
- Kingdom: Animalia
- Phylum: Chordata
- Class: Reptilia
- Order: Testudines
- Suborder: Cryptodira
- Family: Geoemydidae
- Genus: Cuora
- Species: C. yunnanensis

Binomial name
- Cuora yunnanensis (Boulenger, 1906)

Synonyms
- Cyclemys yunnanensis Boulenger, 1906; Cyclemys yannanensis Boulenger, 1907 (ex errore); Cuora yunnanensis Smith, 1931; Cuora vunnanensis Wermuth & Mertens, 1977 (ex errore); Pyxiclemmys yunnanensis Vetter, 2006

= Yunnan box turtle =

Species of turtle

The Yunnan box turtle (Cuora yunnanensis) is a species of turtle in the family Geoemydidae (formerly Bataguridae). It is believed to be endemic to Yunnan, China (in Kunming and Huize) and was suspected to be extinct since the early 20th century; the last verified specimen was collected in 1940.

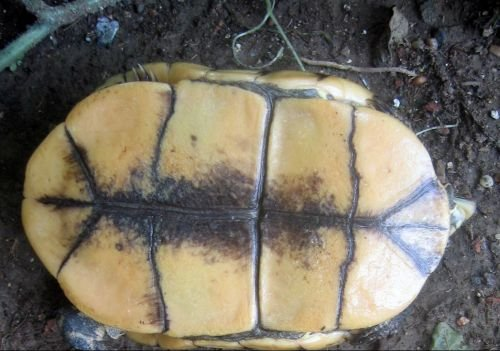
Plastron of a female Yunnan box turtle

In 2004, a living female appeared from the pet trade in Kunming; one year later, a male from the same source and again one year later another female were found there. The validity of these specimens was doubted and many believed they were intentionally produced hybrids, a common technique in China to produce turtles that get high prices.

In 2007, He et al. sampled the three living specimens and gave the genetic proof that all three living specimens are indeed C. yunnanensis and not hybrids. In 2008, Kadoorie Conservation China, a department of Kadoorie Farm and Botanic Garden, together with the Kunming Institute of Zoology and Chinese Academy of Sciences, discovered a small wild population. The distribution of this species remains unclear, but due to its value, it is heavily sought after. Protection measures are needed to save this probably highly endangered species from its return onto the IUCN list of extinct animals.
