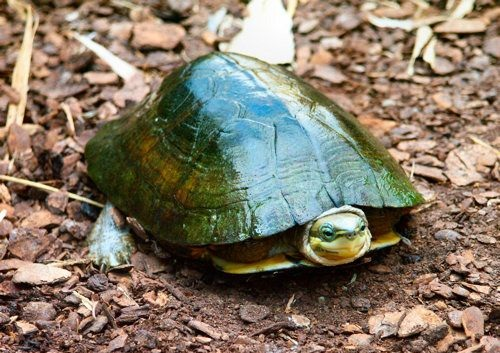

Conservation status
- Critically Endangered (IUCN 2.3)
- CITES Appendix II

Scientific classification
- Kingdom: Animalia
- Phylum: Chordata
- Class: Reptilia
- Order: Testudines
- Suborder: Cryptodira
- Family: Geoemydidae
- Genus: Cuora
- Species: C. zhoui

Binomial name
- Cuora zhoui Zhao, 1990

Synonyms
- Cuora zhoui Zhao in Zhao, T. Zhou & Ye, 1990; Cuora pallidicephala McCord & Iverson, 1991; Pyxiclemmys zhoui — Vetter in Vetter & van Dijk, 2006

= Zhou's box turtle =

Species of turtle

Zhou's box turtle (Cuora zhoui) is a species of turtle in the family Geoemydidae (formerly Bataguridae). The species is apparently endemic to China.

== Etymology ==
The specific name, zhoui, is in honor of Chinese herpetologist Zhou Jiufa.

== Geographic range ==
C. zhoui is only known from Chinese food market specimens, and from a relatively small number of individuals that are part of captive breeding programs in Germany (notably the Münster Zoo), Austria, and the United States. In December 2018, the known captive population numbered about 140 individuals, including 80 hatched at the Münster Zoo. It may be found in the forests of southeastern Yunnan or western Guangxi, although it has never been recorded in the wild.

== Conservation status ==
The over-collection of turtles in Asia for food, medicinal purposes, and the pet trade industry are the primary causes of the decimation of this turtle's population. As of 2012, this species is considered to be critically endangered and in the middle of a conservation crisis.

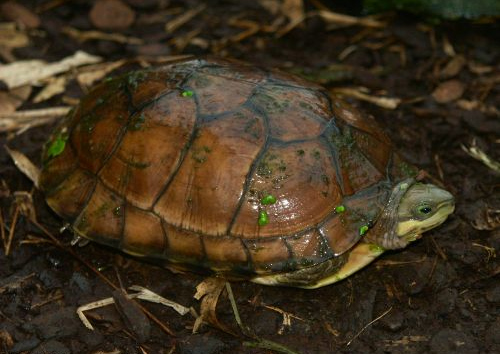
Female

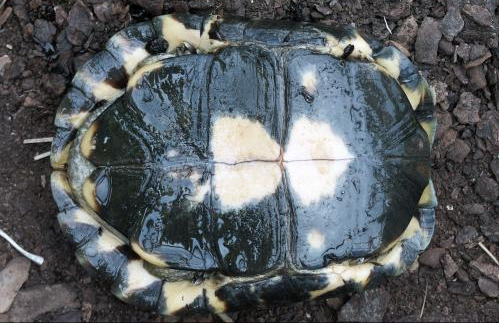
Plastron
