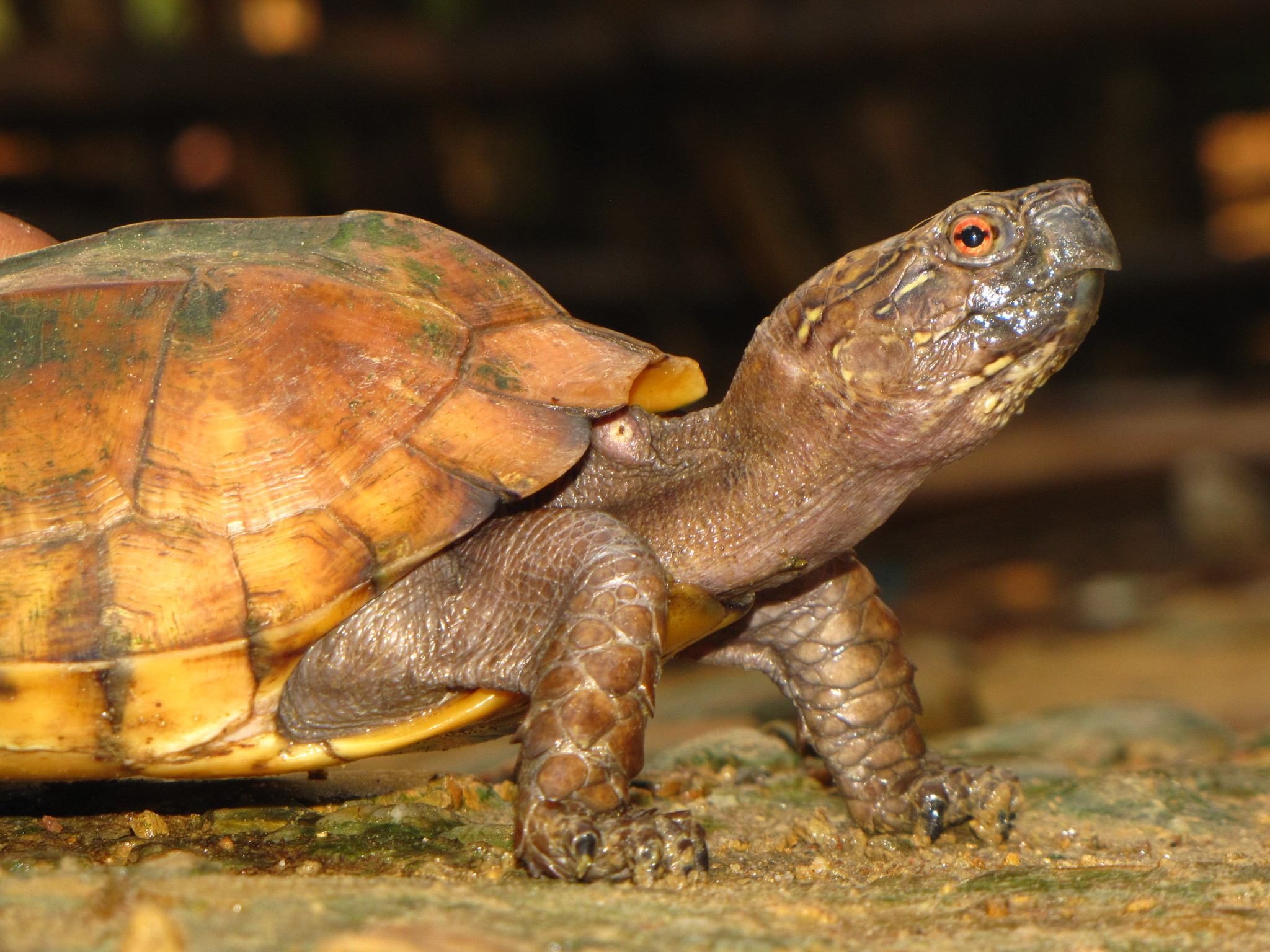
- In India

Conservation status
- Endangered (IUCN 3.1)
- CITES Appendix II

Scientific classification
- Kingdom: Animalia
- Phylum: Chordata
- Class: Reptilia
- Order: Testudines
- Suborder: Cryptodira
- Family: Geoemydidae
- Genus: Cuora
- Species: C. mouhotii

Binomial name
- Cuora mouhotii Gray, 1862

Synonyms
- C. m. mouhotii List: Cyclemys mouhotii Gray, 1862; Pyxidea mouhotii — Gray, 1863; Emys mouhotii — Strauch, 1865; Cyclemys mouhoti [sic] Boulenger, 1890 (ex errore); Pyxidea mouhoti — M.A. Smith, 1931; Emys mouhoti — Bourret, 1941; Pyxidea mouboti [sic] H.M. Smith & James, 1958 (ex errore); Geoemyda mouhoti — McDowell, 1964; Cyclemys mouheti [sic] Tikader & R.C. Sharma, 1985 (ex errore); Geoemyda mouhotii — Artner, 1995; Pyxidea mouhotii mouhotii — Fritz, Andreas & Lehr, 1998; Pyxidea mouhotti [sic] Hallermann, Dirksen & Uetz, 1999 (ex errore); Cuora mouhotii mouhotii — Artner, 2003; C. m. obsti List: Pyxidea mouhotii obsti Fritz, Andreas & Lehr, 1998; Pyxidea mouhotti [sic] obsti Hallermann, Dirksen & Uetz, 1999 (ex errore); Cuora mouhotii obsti — Artner, 2003

= Keeled box turtle =

Species of turtle

The keeled box turtle (Cuora mouhotii; syn. Pyxidea mouhotii) is a species of turtle in the family Geoemydidae. The species is endemic to Asia.

== Geographic range ==
Cuora mouhotii occurs in Bangladesh, Myanmar (Burma), China, India, Laos, and Vietnam, and also in Bhutan and Thailand.

== Common names ==
Other common names for Cuora mouhotii include keel-backed terrapin, jagged-shelled turtle, and Mouhot's turtle.

== Etymology ==
The specific name, mouhotii, is in honor of Alexandre Henri Mouhot (1826–1861), a French naturalist and explorer.

The subspecific name, obsti, is in honor of German herpetologist Fritz Jürgen Obst (1939–2018).

== Taxonomy ==
Cuora mouhotii is sometimes treated as the sole species of the monotypic genus Pyxidea. Phylogenetic analysis using mitochondrial DNA has provided evidence that the species is part of the "Cuora group", a monophyletic group of Asian box turtles, and the name Pyxidea should probably be synonymized with Cuora, making the keeled box turtle part of that genus. Other phylogenetic studies of Cuora support this conclusion. In addition, its morphology is not distinct enough from that of Cuora species to keep it separate, and it is known to hybridize with Cuora galbinifrons.

== Subspecies ==
There are two subspecies which are recognized as being valid.

Subspecies	Image
Cuora mouhotii mouhotii (Gray, 1862)	
Cuora mouhotii obsti Fritz, Andreas & Lehr, 1998	

Nota bene: A trinomial authority in parentheses indicates that the subspecies was originally described in a genus other than Cuora.

== Hybridization ==
The southern Vietnamese population of Cuora mouhotii lives alongside Cuora picturata. Since Cuora mouhotii is known to hybridize with the closest living relatives of Cuora picturata (Cuora galbinifrons and Cuora bourreti ) there is a possibility of hybridization in the wild between these two populations.

== Description ==
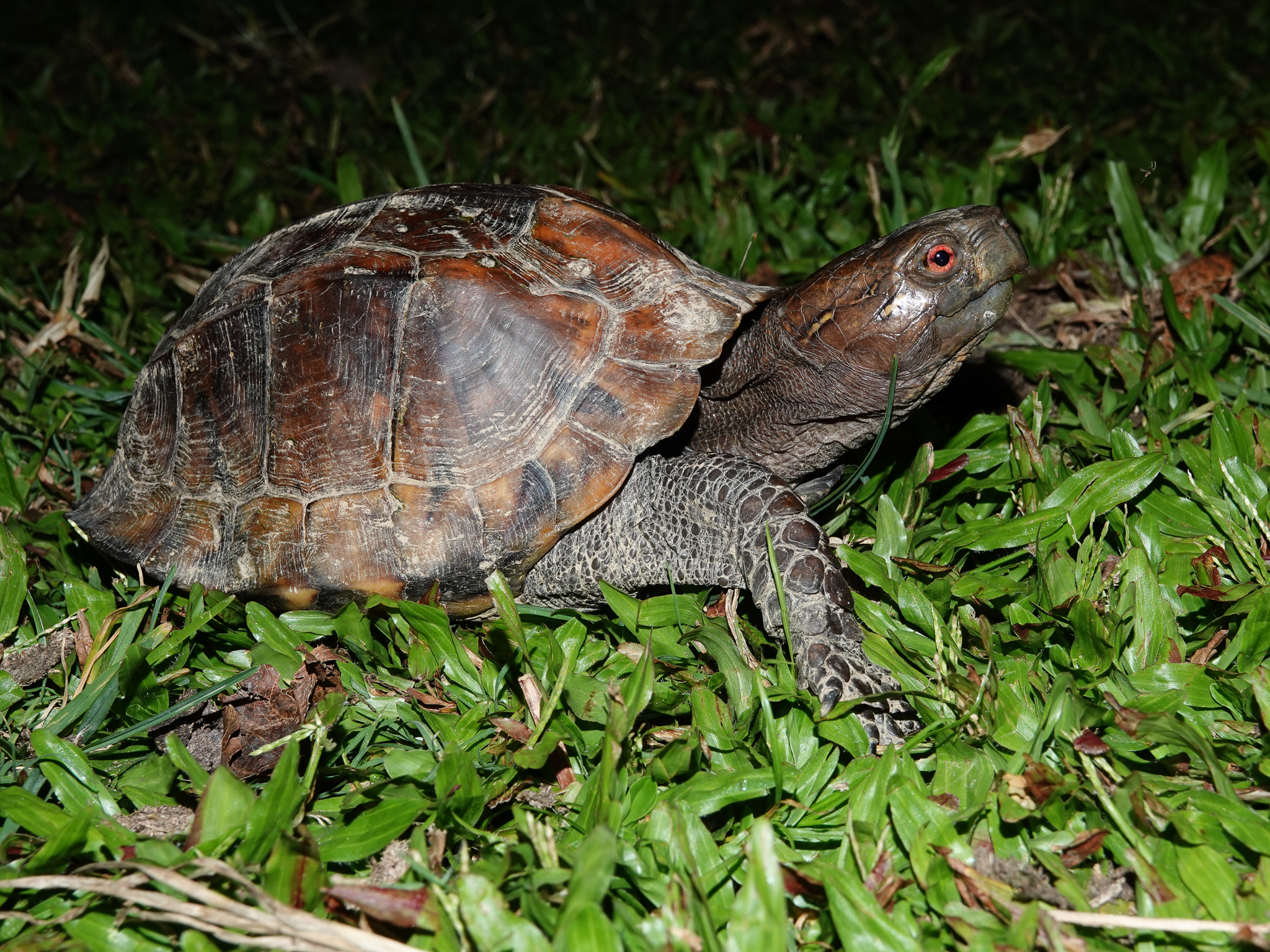
In India

The keeled box turtle's upper shell (carapace) has three large, raised ridges and is serrated on the back end. The lower shell (plastron) is different variations of brown in color, ranging from light brown to dark brown. The upper jaw is strong, while the snout is short and curved. The feet are only partially webbed, which suggest a terrestrial lifestyle as opposed to an aquatic one.

Male and female keeled box turtles can be distinguished by the color of their eyes as well as their nails. A male generally has longer and thicker nails than a female, and eyes that are either black or brown. A female generally has shorter, thinner nails, and eyes that are orange or red.

== Biology ==
The biology of Cuora mouhotii is not well known.

In one survey, males and females had an average straight carapace length around 15 to 17 cm (5.9 to 6.7 in).

The breeding season is in May through September. The average clutch size was four eggs, which are smooth, white, and about 4.4 cm (1.7 in) long. On average they typically lay two clutches in a breeding season. Like many other turtles the keeled box turtle does not care for its young. Females have been noted to dig nests with their rear legs and cover the clutches with soil, and also to lay eggs under fallen leaves.

The male keeled box turtle is very aggressive during the act of mating. In some instances the male turtle will chase and injure a female. The male will often persist until the female allows its advances.

== Diet ==
The keeled box turtle is herbivorous, and eats a wide variety of vegetation in the natural environment, with a preference for wild fallen fruits. It will also occasionally eat worms, snails, and other meat.

== Habitat ==
The keeled box turtle is a terrestrial species, and can be frequently found in small caves and rock crevices. It can also be found in forests, in deep layers of leaves.

== Conservation status ==
Cuora mouhotii is listed as an endangered species by the International Union for Conservation of Nature (IUCN).

The population of the keeled box turtle has been on a steep decline in some areas, particularly Vietnam. This can be attributed to people capturing it for food and pets, as well as Vietnam legally exporting large numbers. Although there are other possible reasons behind this population decline, deforestation and hunting have proven to be a major threat to this turtle especially.

Threats include habitat destruction and degradation during deforestation. In parts of its range it is threatened by overexploitation as it is collected from the wild, especially for food. It is also used in traditional medicine. It is consumed locally and traded internationally for the food market and the pet trade.

In China the species is bred in captivity on a small scale for the pet trade.

== Gallery ==
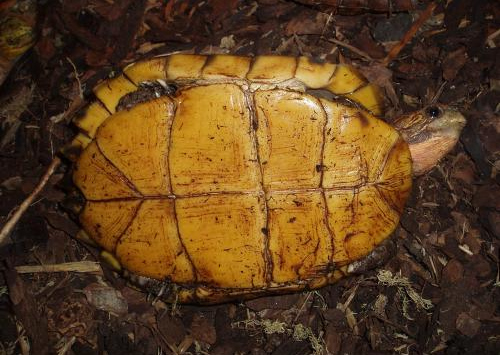
C. m. mouhotii, plastron.

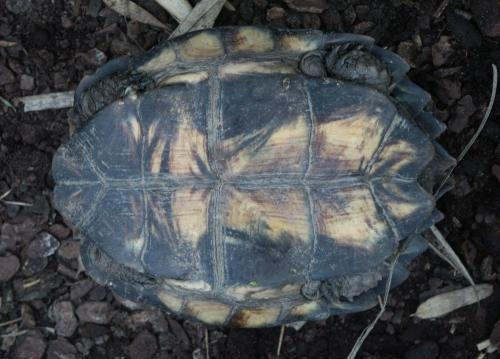
C. m. obsti, plastron.
