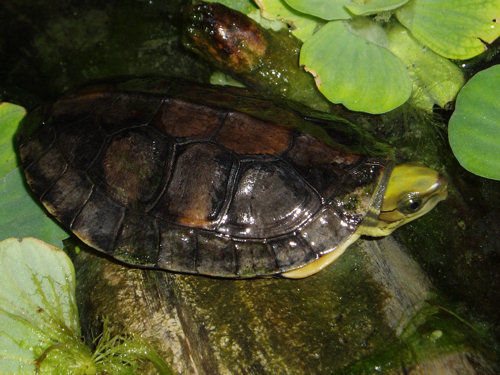

Conservation status
- Critically Endangered (IUCN 2.3)
- CITES Appendix II

Scientific classification
- Kingdom: Animalia
- Phylum: Chordata
- Class: Reptilia
- Order: Testudines
- Suborder: Cryptodira
- Family: Geoemydidae
- Genus: Cuora
- Species: C. aurocapitata

Binomial name
- Cuora aurocapitata Luo & Zong, 1988

Synonyms
- Cuora aurocapitata Luo & Zhong, 1988; Cuora aureocapitata Patterson, 1994 (ex errore); Cuora pani aurocapitata Artner, 2003; Pyxiclemmys aurocapitata Vetter, 2006; Pyxiclemmys pani aurocapitata Vetter, 2006

= Yellow-headed box turtle =

Species of turtle

The yellow-headed box turtle or golden-headed box turtle (Cuora aurocapitata) is a proposed species of turtle in the family Geoemydidae (formerly Bataguridae). It is sometimes considered a subspecies of Pan's box turtle (Cuora pani aurocapitata).

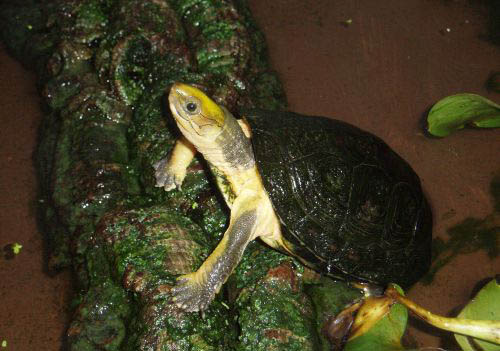
Female

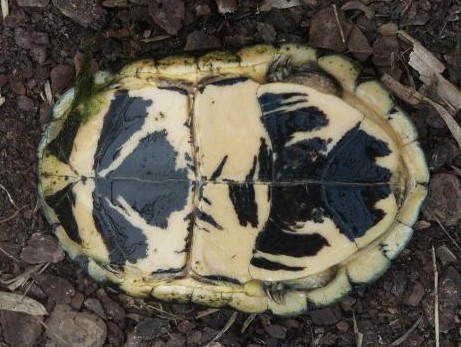
Plastron

This turtle is endemic to the central Chinese Anhui province. It is found in Nanling County, Yi County, Guangde County, and Jing County.

== Diet ==
Yellow-headed box turtles are semi-aquatic omnivores who require a varied diet mainly consisting of earthworms, snails, small fish, leafy greens, fungi, various fruit and fallen berries.
