= Fritz Jürgen Obst =

German herpetologist and museum director

- Born: April 3, 1939; Dresden, Germany
- Died: June 10, 2018 (aged 79); Radebeul, Germany
- Known for: Research on snakes and turtles
- Scientific career
- Fields: Herpetology
- Institutions: Museum für Tierkunde Dresden

Fritz Jürgen Obst (3 April 1939 – 10 June 2018) was a German herpetologist and museum director. His main research interests were snakes and turtles.

== Biography ==
Obst lost his father at the age of four and grew up as a half-orphan in war-torn Dresden. After completing secondary school, he intended to study biology but could not leave the city due to his mother’s care needs. Instead, he studied art education and history and worked as a teacher. Following his mother’s death in 1964, he began studying biology at the University of Leipzig, completing his degree in 1968 with a diploma thesis titled Taxonomic Studies on European Land Tortoises (Reptilia: Testudinidae) Using Serological-Immunological Methods.

He married his wife Ingeborg in 1964; she died in 2012. They had one son. During his studies, Obst worked as a volunteer and later as a part-time employee at the Museum für Tierkunde Dresden. In 1968 he became curator of the herpetological collection, which had been largely destroyed during the war. His many international contacts were instrumental in rebuilding the collection, including securing the acquisition of the dissolved collection of the Leipzig Zoological Institute.

Obst undertook numerous study and collecting trips, including to Eastern Europe, the Mongolian People’s Republic, Tajikistan, Uzbekistan, and Turkmenistan. The herpetofauna of the former Soviet republics remains a core part of the Dresden museum’s collections. As an East German scientist, Obst was also able to travel to non-socialist countries, visiting Austria, the Netherlands, Switzerland, and, from the mid-1980s, West Germany. In 1993, while in Madagascar, he and colleagues were mistakenly fired upon by police; two participants were killed and Obst was left nearly blind in his left eye.

In the late 1980s, Obst became deputy director of the Dresden museum. Following the death of Gerhard Mathé in 1994, he was appointed acting director and became director in June 1995. He oversaw the construction of the Adolf-Bernhard-Meyer building in Klotzsche, a modern research and storage facility. In 2000, the museum was merged with the Museum für Mineralogie und Geologie Dresden and the Naturhistorische Zentralbibliothek Dresden into the Senckenberg Naturhistorische Sammlungen Dresden. In December 2000, he was awarded the title of professor by the Saxon state government. He served as director until his retirement in 2001.

Obst was active in herpetological organizations. He joined Salamander in 1958, which became the German Society for Herpetology and Herpetoculture (DGHT) in 1964. In 1959, he co-founded the herpetology and terrarium science working group in the Kulturbund der DDR. In 1990, largely through his initiative, the first DGHT city group in eastern Germany was established after reunification. In 1999–2000 he led a project to reintroduce the dice snake in the Elbe Valley near Meißen.

In 2015, he and co-author Bernd Sparmann received the Saxon State Prize for Local History Research for their book Bergmannsleuchter – Sächsisches Zinn in besonderer Form.

In 2018, Obst curated his final exhibition, Amphibios – vom Wunder der Verwandlung ("Amphibios – the Wonder of Transformation"), at the Museum der Westlausitz Kamenz, which was accompanied by a book of the same title. He died on 10 June 2018 after a long illness. He was buried on 10 July 2018 at the Radebeul-West cemetery.

== Eponyms ==
The following three taxa of reptiles are named in honor of Obst.

- Emys orbicularis fritzjuergenobsti Fritz, 1993 – a subspecies of the European pond turtle
- Cuora mouhotii obsti Fritz, Andreas & Lehr, 1998 – a subspecies of the keeled box turtle
- Pristurus obsti Rösler & Wranik, 1999 – a species of gecko

== Selected works ==
- with Walter Meusel: Die Landschildkröten Europas, 1963 (6 editions through 1978).
- with Hans-Albert Pederzani (ed.): Schildkröten, 1980.
- with Wolf-Eberhard Engelmann: Mit gespaltener Zunge. Aus der Biologie und Kulturgeschichte der Schlangen, 1981. (English edition: Snakes. Biology, Behavior and Relationship to Man, 1982).
- Schmuckschildkröten. Die Gattung Chrysemys, 1983.
- with Klaus Richter and Udo Jacob: Lexikon der Terraristik und Herpetologie, 1984. (English edition: The Completely Illustrated Atlas of Reptiles and Amphibians for the Terrarium, 1988).
- Die Welt der Schildkröten, 1985. (English edition: Turtles, Tortoises and Terrapins, 1986).
- with Wolf-Eberhard Engelmann, Jürgen Fritsche, Rainer Günther: Lurche und Kriechtiere Europas, 1985 (2nd ed. 1993).
- Die Amphibien und Reptilien Deutschlands, 1996.
- Amphibios – vom Wunder der Verwandlung, 2008.
- with Bernd Sparmann: Bergmannsleuchter – Sächsisches Zinn in besonderer Form, 2015.
