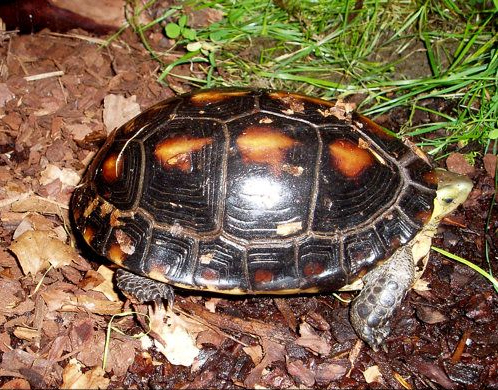
- Ryukyu box turtle (Cuora flavomarginata evelynae)

Conservation status
- Endangered (IUCN 2.3)
- CITES Appendix II

Scientific classification
- Kingdom: Animalia
- Phylum: Chordata
- Class: Reptilia
- Order: Testudines
- Suborder: Cryptodira
- Family: Geoemydidae
- Genus: Cuora
- Species: C. flavomarginata

Binomial name
- Cuora flavomarginata (Gray, 1863)

Subspecies
- C. f. flavomarginata; C. f. evelynae

Synonyms
- Cistoclemmys flavomarginata Gray 1863:175; Cyclemys flavomarginata sinensis Hsü 1930:3; Terrapene culturalia Yeh 1961:59 †; Cuora evelynae Ernst and Lovich 1990:26

= Chinese box turtle =

Yellow margined box turtle

Species of turtle

The Chinese box turtle (simplified Chinese: 食蛇龟; traditional Chinese: 食蛇龜; pinyin: shíshéguī; lit. 'Snake-eating turtle'), also known as the yellow-margined box turtle, or golden-headed turtle, is a species of Asian box turtle. Taxonomically, it is called Cuora flavomarginata.

== Anatomy ==
C. flavomarginata has a highly domed shell, the carapace and plastron of which are a dark brown with a cream-yellow stripe on the vertebral keel. The edge of the plastron is lightly pigmented due to the marginal scutes' and plastral scutes' lighter pigmentation near their edges. The skin on the limbs is brown, while the top of the head is pale green. Each side of the head has a yellow line extending from behind the eye backward. The skin beneath the head and between the limbs is a lighter pinkish color.

The name box turtle refers to C. flavomarginata's ability to bring the plastron to the edges of the carapace. This is enabled by a hinge on the plastron and ligaments connecting the carapace and plastron, which allows for limited movement.

The forefeet have five claws, while the rear have four.

The external difference between male and female C. flavomarginata is slight. Males have a broader tail than females that is almost triangular in shape.

== Distribution ==
C. flavomarginata is found in Central China: Hunan, Henan, Anhui, Hubei, Chongqing, eastern Sichuan, Zhejiang & Jiangsu provinces (generally along the Yangtze drainage). It is also found in Taiwan and Japan, specifically the Ryukyu Islands, Ishigaki, and Iriomote.

== Ecology and life history ==
=== Trophic ecology ===
C. flavomarginata is omnivorous, and will eat a large variety of foods. "Adults favor earthworms, frozen pinkies (defrosted), snails, slugs, and mealworms. They also eat dry trout chow and moistened dry cat food, canned cat food; fruits including strawberries, bananas, cantaloupe, and papaya; and vegetables including grated carrots, corn on the cob, and squash. Leafy greens are ignored. Invertebrates that the turtles hunt for include June bug (Phyllophaga) larvae and slugs being principal prey."

=== Predation ===
Eggs of Chinese box turtles are eaten by Formosa kukri snakes, Iriomote cats and large, predatory birds.

== Systematics and taxonomic history ==
In 1863, John Edward Gray described the species as Cistoclemmys flavomarginata. It was later moved to Cyclemys, and then to Cuora. In the 2012 issue of the Turtle Taxonomy Working Group's Checklist, the species is listed as Cuora with two recognized subspecies.

Two subspecies have been recognised:

- Cuora flavomarginata flavomarginata
- Cuora flavomarginata evelynae

This species has hybridized with Mauremys japonica in captivity and with female Ryukyu black-breasted leaf turtles both in captivity and in the wild.

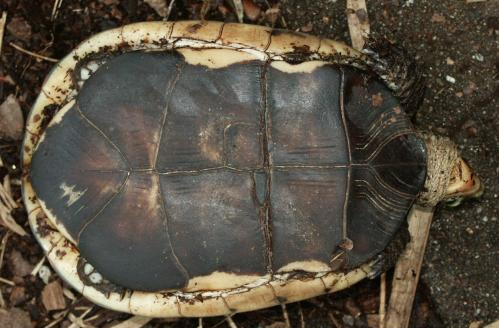
C.f.evelynae plastron

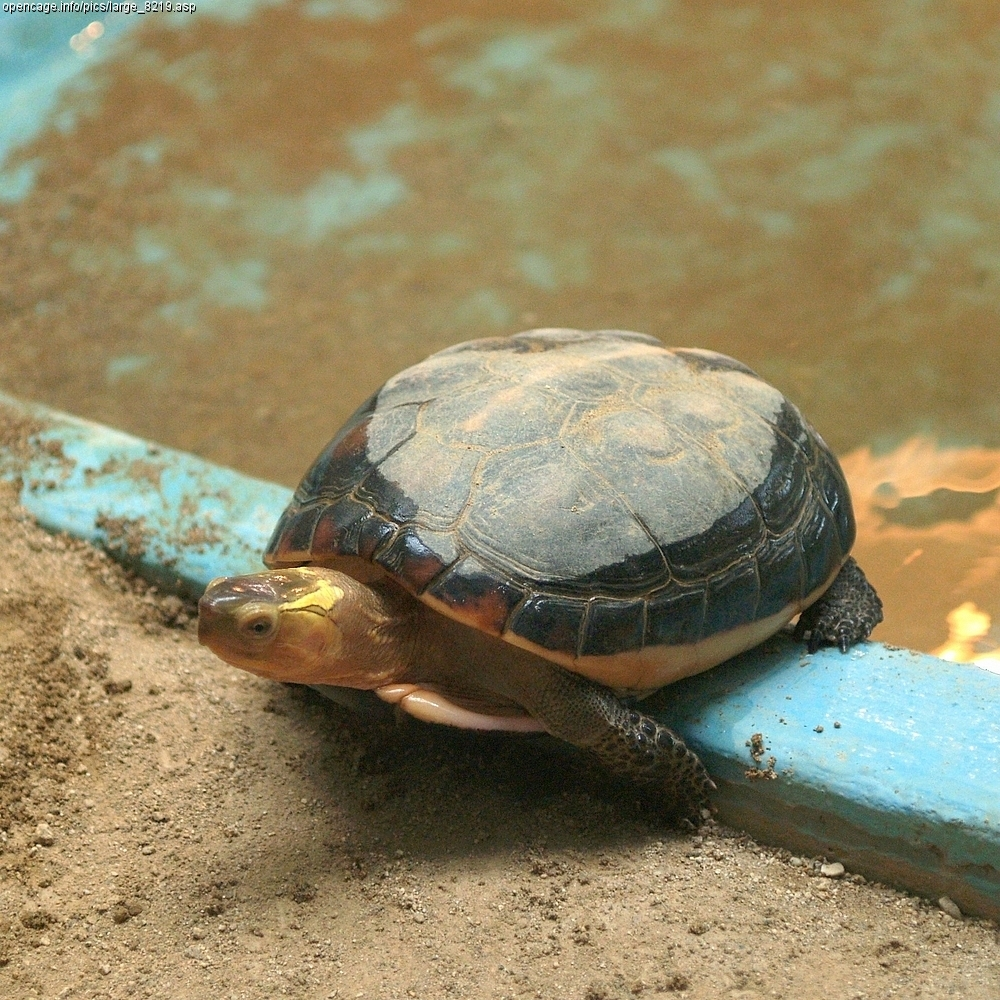
Young adult

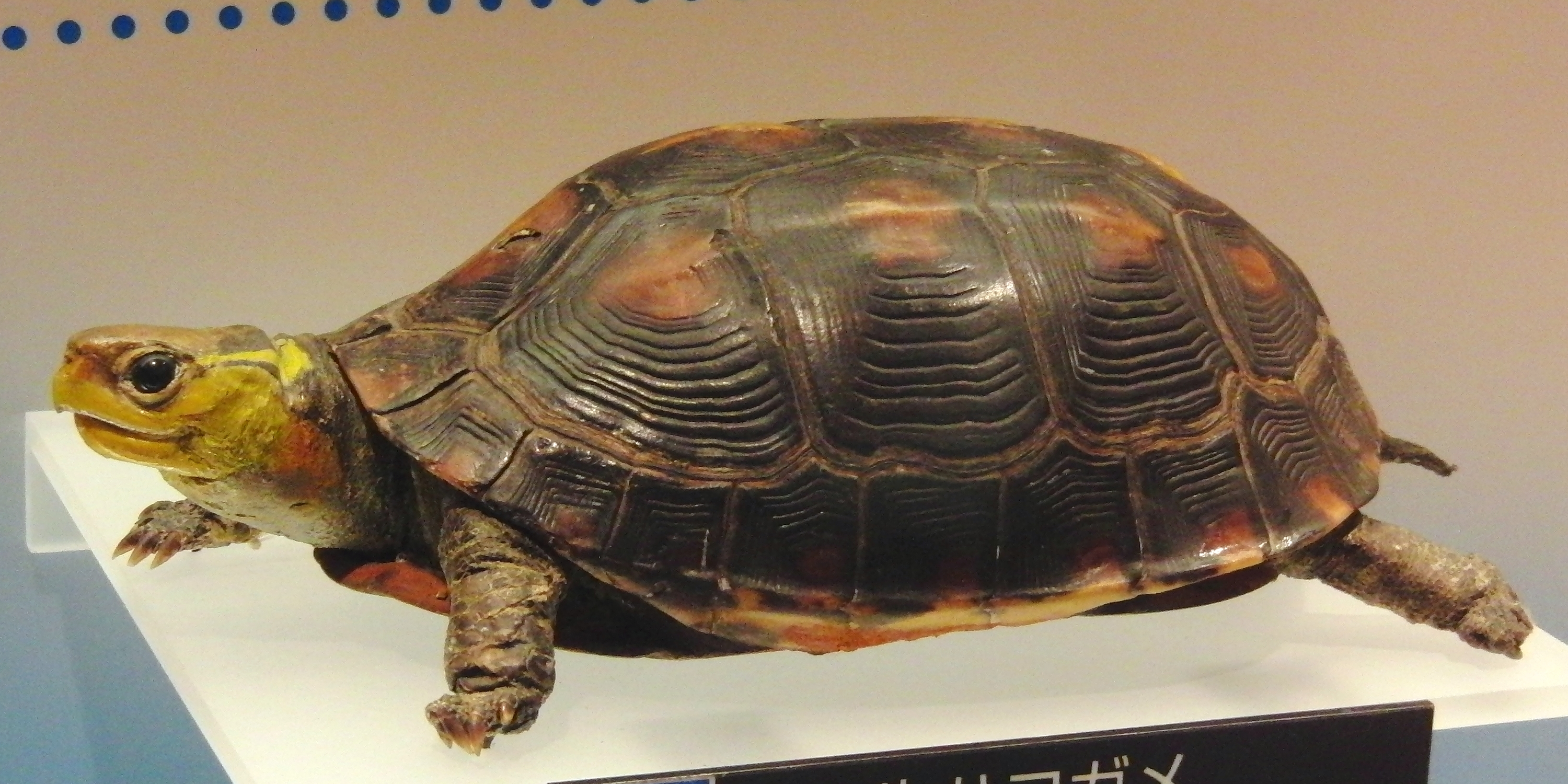
Stuffed specimen of Cuora flavomarginata, exhibited in the National Museum of Nature and Science, Tokyo, Japan.

== Conservation ==
The yellow-margined box turtle is considered to be an endangered species by the IUCN. Threats to the Taiwanese population include habitat loss due to expansion of cultivated lands.
