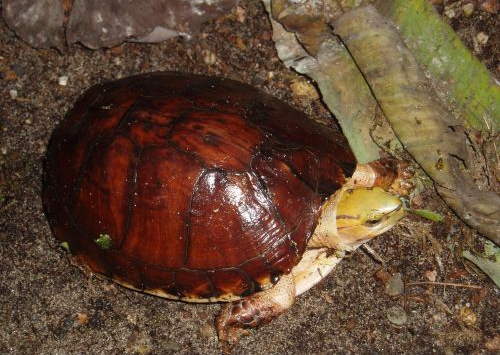
- Adult female

Conservation status
- Critically Endangered (IUCN 2.3)
- CITES Appendix II

Scientific classification
- Kingdom: Animalia
- Phylum: Chordata
- Class: Reptilia
- Order: Testudines
- Suborder: Cryptodira
- Family: Geoemydidae
- Genus: Cuora
- Species: C. mccordi

Binomial name
- Cuora mccordi Ernst, 1988

Synonyms
- Cuora mccordi Ernst, 1988; Cuora accordi [sic] Nöllert, 1992 (ex errore); Cistoclemmys mccordi — Vetter, 2006

= McCord's box turtle =

Species of turtle

McCord's box turtle (Cuora mccordi) is a species of semi-aquatic turtle in the family Geoemydidae. The species is native to the southern Chinese province of Guangxi. The species was first described in 1988 from specimens obtained through the wildlife trade, which resulted in prolonged uncertainty regarding its natural distribution.

== Etymology ==
The specific name, mccordi, is in honor of American veterinarian William Patrick McCord (born 1950).

== Taxonomy ==
Originally described by American herpetologist Carl Henry Ernst in 1988 from a specimen obtained through the Chinese pet trade, Cuora mccordi lacked geographic range data for 19 years until field investigations in the early 2000s documented the species in its natural habitat in Guangxi Province.

The species belongs to the genus Cuora, a group of Asian box turtles characterized by their hinged plastron, allowing the shell to close completely. Its family, Geoemydidae, formerly included within Batagurinae, is a diverse family of turtles commonly known as Asian pond turtles or Eurasian river turtles. Phylogenetic analyses have shown that species within the genus are closely related, but exhibit complex evolutionary relationships, including evidence of hybridization and mitochondrial introgression among some taxa.

== Description ==
Cuora mccordi is a small box turtle characterized by a highly domed carapace and a hinged plastron that allows the shell to close completely. This allows it to completely conceal its head and limbs for protection. The carapace typically ranges from dark brown to chestnut in coloration, while the plastron is yellow and often marked with darker patterns. The head is typically yellow with darker stripes extending along the sides of the face and neck. The limbs and tail are generally yellow to yellow-brown. Adults typically reach a straight carapace length of approximately 14–18 centimeters. Sexual dimorphism is present, with males generally exhibiting longer, thicker tails and a more concave plastron compared to females, while females tend to have short tails and flatter plastrons.

== Biology and behavior ==
The natural lifespan of Cuora mccordi is unknown due to the species only living in captivity. They typically mate in March, and lay up to 7 eggs per clutch approximately 60 days after. Females are able to lay multiple clutches as the season progresses, however the incubation period of successful clutches range up to 90 days.

Cuora mccordi is omnivorous. Its diet includes small aquatic organisms and invertebrates, as well as plant material.

These turtles are observed to be nocturnal and crepuscular. They burrow into the ground or hide under leaves during daylight hours.

== Geographic range ==
McCord's box turtle is endemic to the central Guangxi province in China. While they are thought to be an aquatic species, inhabiting small streams and wetlands, they also spend time on land where they feed and mate.

== Conservation status ==
Cuora mccordi is classified as critically endangered by the International Union for Conservation of Nature (IUCN), and is considered a protected species under Chinese legislation and CITES. It is regarded as a rare turtle species in Asia, having experienced substantial population declines as a result of intensive collection for international pet trade and ongoing habitat degradation. The species has not been reliably documented in the wild in recent years, and the limited availability of field data has led some researchers to suggest it may be functionally extinct in its natural environment. Despite this, the species continues to survive in captive populations such as zoos and breeding facilities, which are considered essential for conservation and potential future recovery efforts.

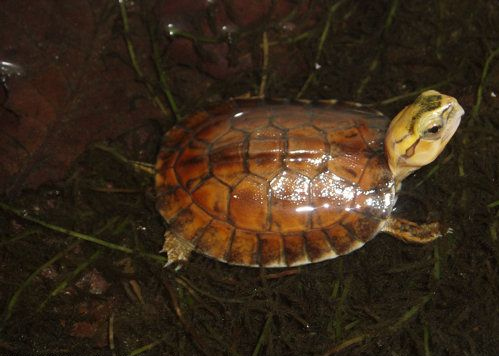
Juvenile

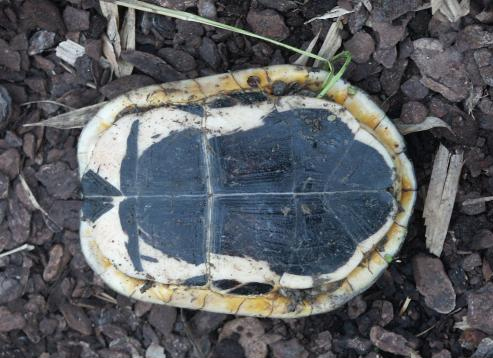
Plastron

== Bibliography ==
- Zhou T, Blanck T, McCord WP, Li P-P (2008). "Tracking Cuora mccordi (Ernst, 1988); the first record of its natural habitat; a re-description; with data on captive populations and its vulnerability". Hamadryad 32 (1): 46–58.
- Ernst CH (1988). "Cuora mccordi, a new Chinese box turtle from Guangxi Province". Proceedings of the Biological Society of Washington 101: 466–470.
- Spinks, P. Q., & Shaffer, H. B. (2007). "Conservation phylogenetics of the Asian box turtles (Geoemydidae, Cuora): mitochondrial introgression, numts, and inferences from multiple nuclear loci". Conservation Genetics 8 (3): 641–657.
- Jiang, H., Shen, Y., Wang, H., Zhao, H., & Chen, X. (2022). "Complete mitochondrial genome of the common Cuora (Cuora mccordi), China". Mitochondrial DNA Part B: Resources 7 (7): 1350–1351.
- Smithsonian's National Zoo & Conservation Biology Institute. "McCord's box turtle".
- Philadelphia Zoo. "McCord's box turtle".
- Spinks, P. Q., Thomson, R. C., Zhang, Y., Che, J., Wu, Y., & Shaffer, H. B. (2012). "Species boundaries and phylogenetic relationships in the critically endangered Asian box turtle genus Cuora". Molecular Phylogenetics and Evolution 63 (3): 656–667.
- Spinks, P. Q., Shaffer, H. B., Iverson, J. B., & McCord, W. P. (2004). "Phylogenetic hypotheses for the turtle family Geoemydidae". Molecular Phylogenetics and Evolution.
- Fritz U, Havaš P (2007). "Checklist of Chelonians of the World". Vertebrate Zoology 57 (2): 217.
- Zhou T (2007). "A survey of captive population dynamics for six endemic Chinese box turtle species". Sichuan Journal of Zoology, Chengdu 26 (2): 448–450.
- Zhou T, Li P-P (2007). "Chelonian species diversity and current status in China". Sichuan Journal of Zoology 26 (2): 464–467. (in Chinese)
- Zhou T (2007b). "Endemic Chinese box turtles". China Nature (2): 20–22. (in Chinese)
