= Kélonia =

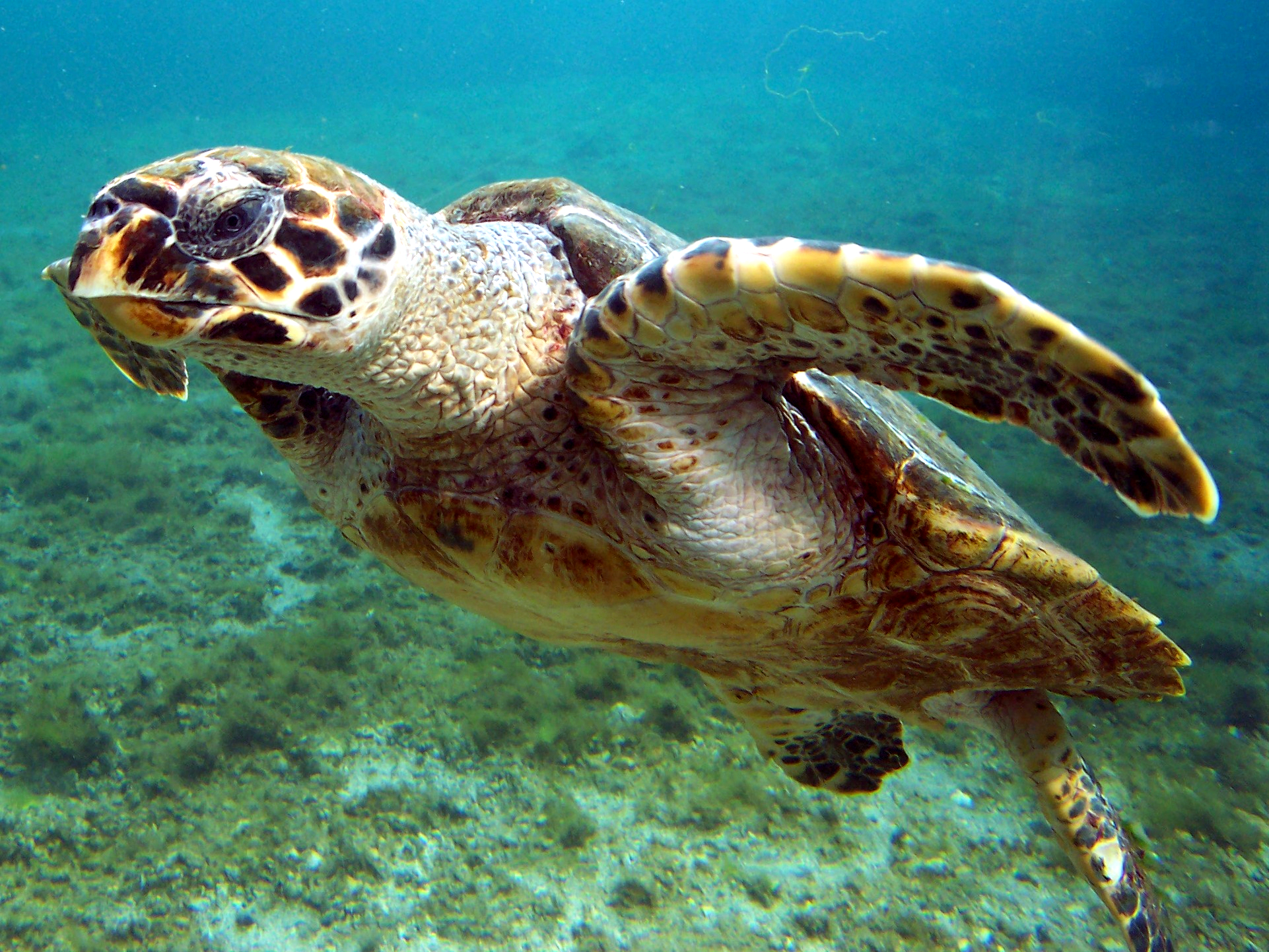
- Hawksbill sea turtle at Kélonia
- Interactive map of Kélonia
- 21.152469°S 55.280206°E
- Date opened: 16 August 2006
- Location: Saint-Leu, Réunion, France
- Website: www.kelonia.org/00-GB/index-gb.html

Kélonia is a public aquarium and observatory specialising in Marine turtles in Saint-Leu, Réunion.

It was built on the site of a former Turtle Ranch and hosts guided visits and educational workshops. Kélonia participates in different research programs on marine turtles. These include migratory studies, monitoring populations and genetics.

It also has a turtle clinic which cares for injured marine turtles to return them to the wild.

== Images ==
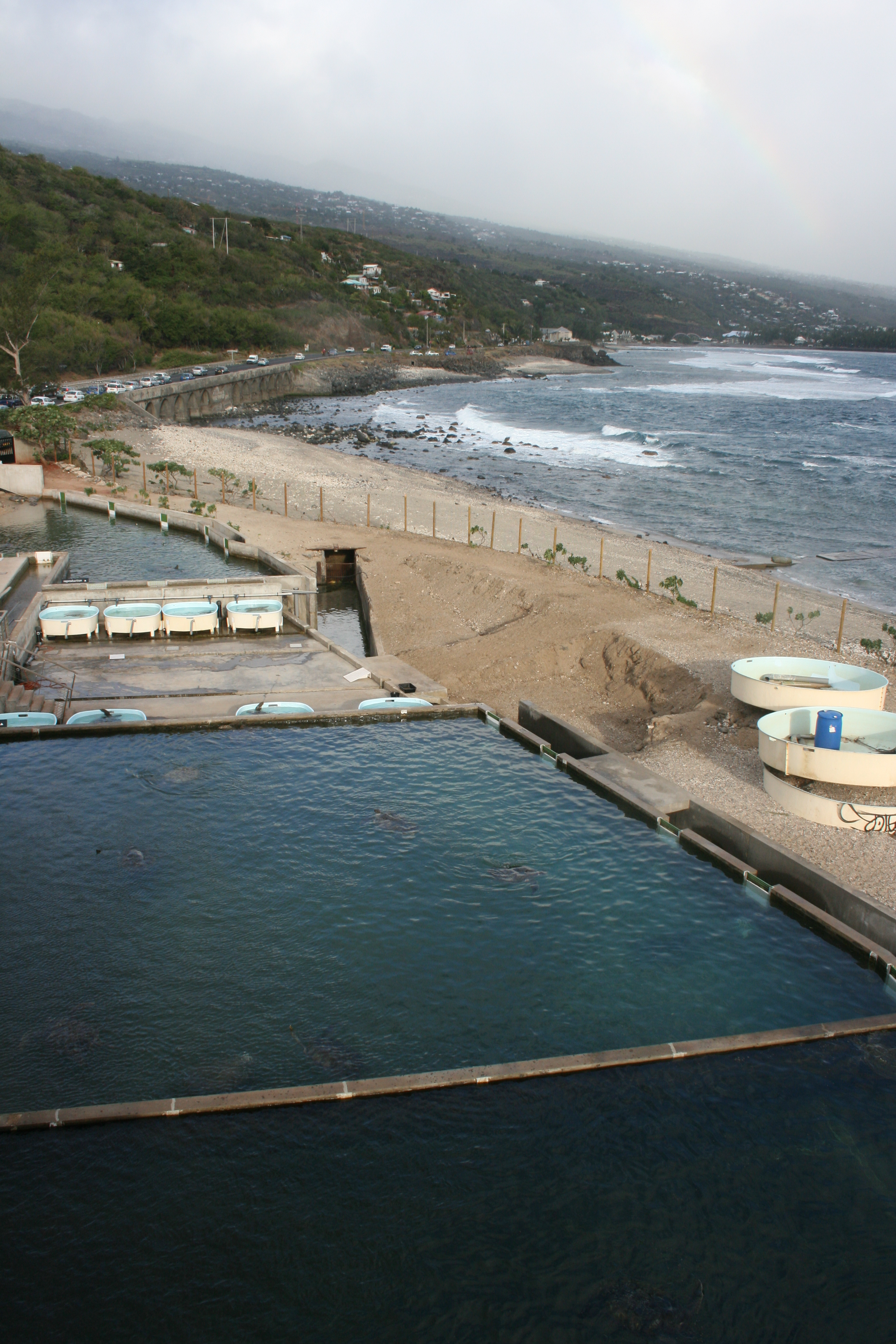
Bassins

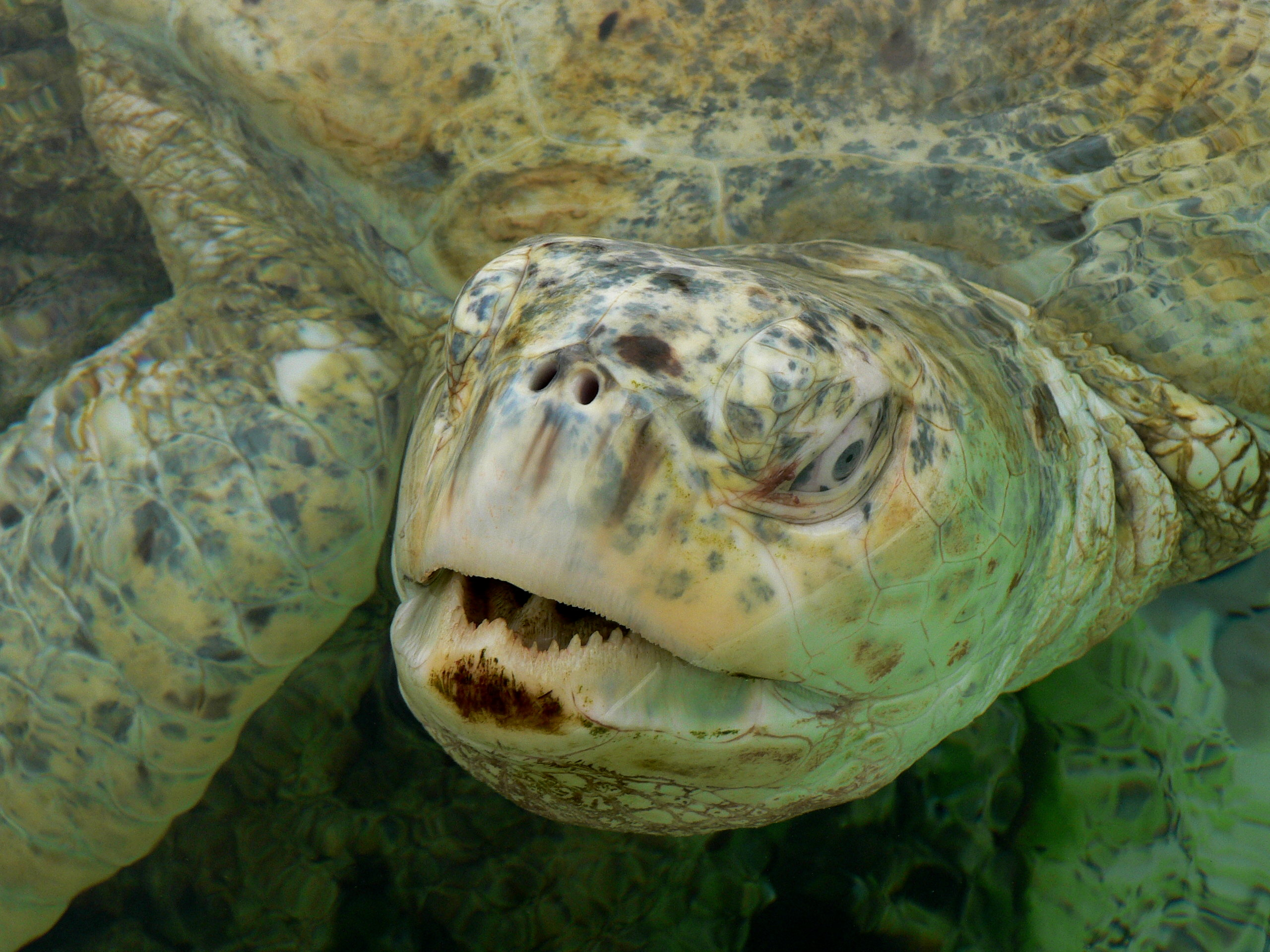
Albino green sea turtle

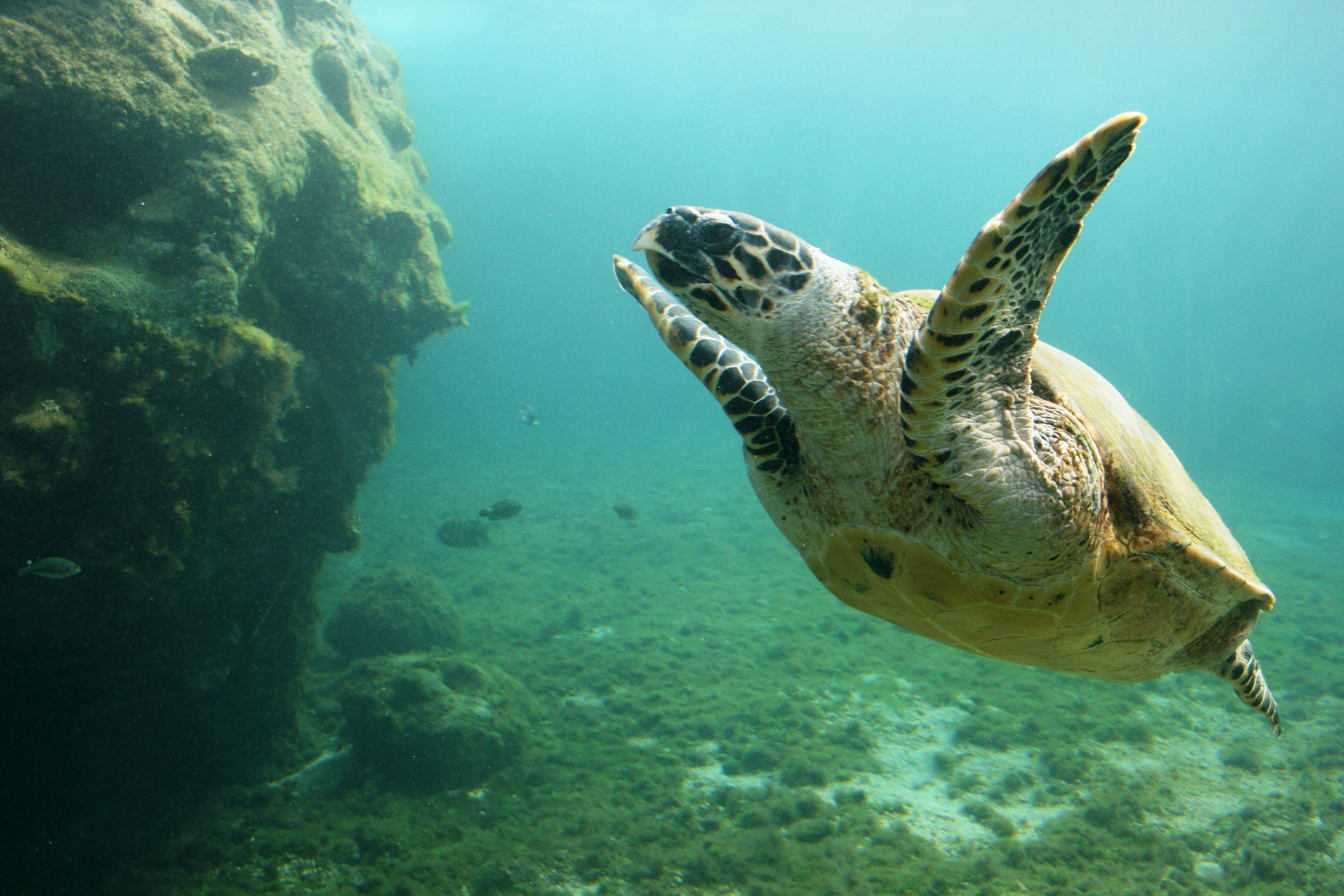
Hawksbill sea turtle

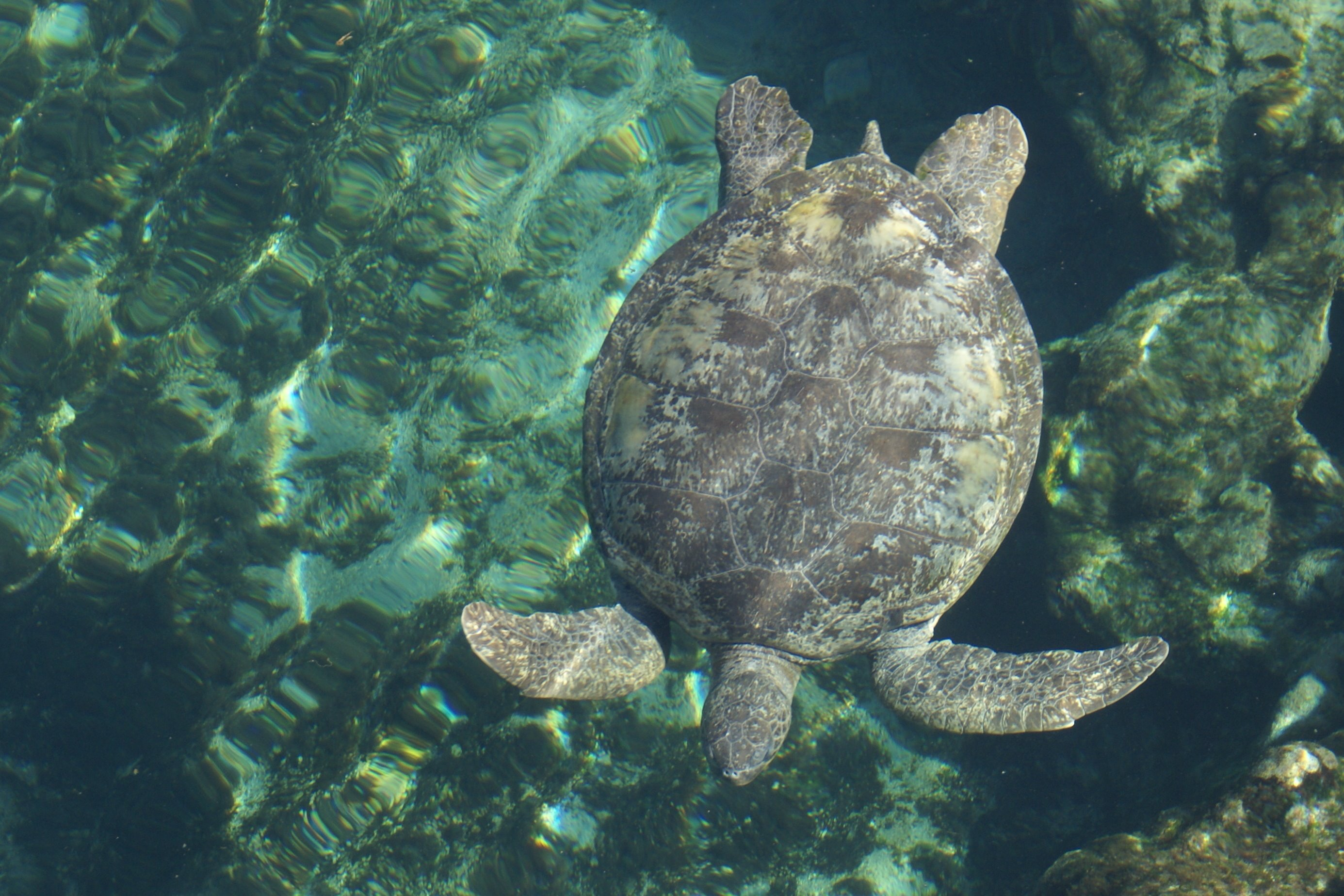
Green sea turtle

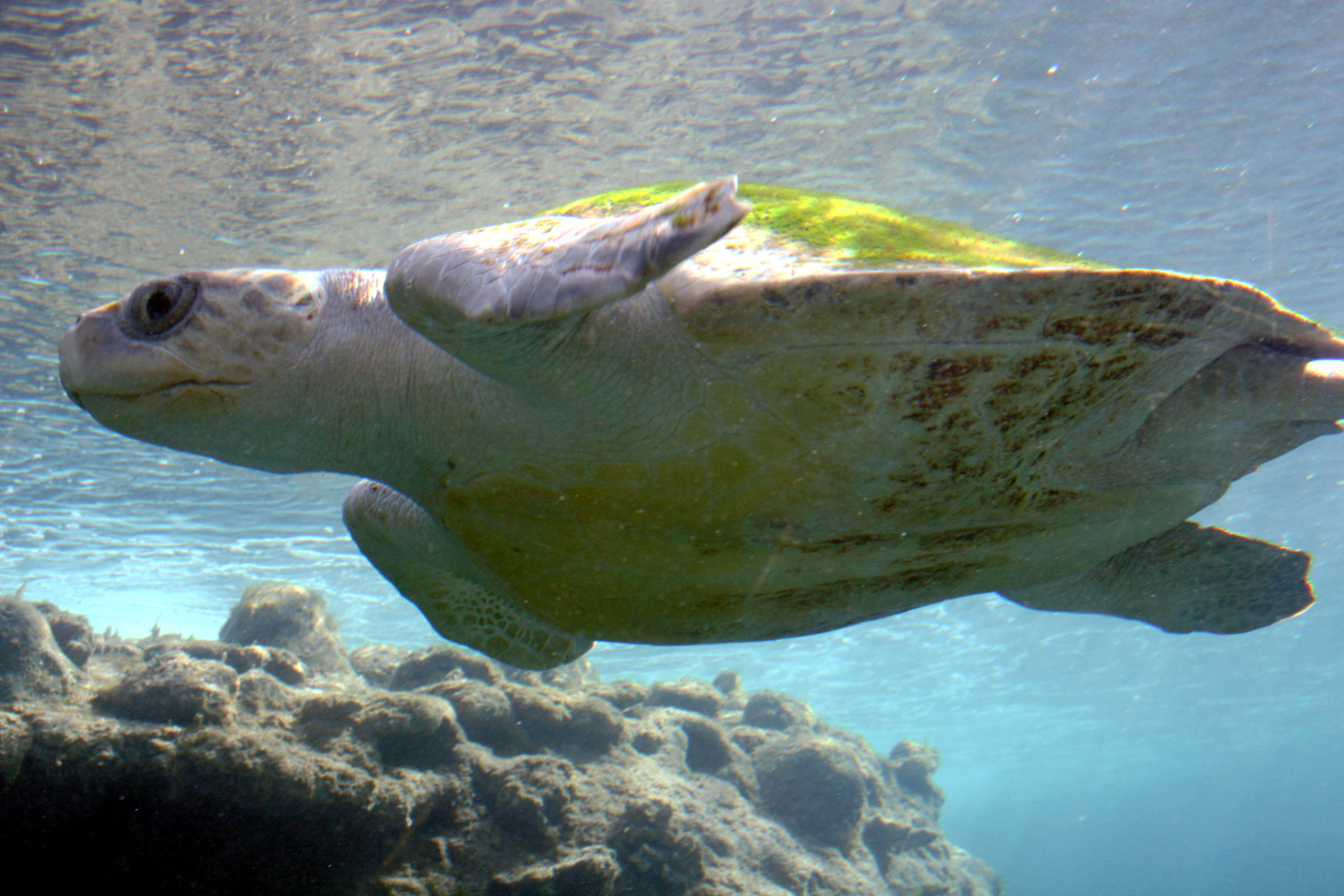
Olive ridley sea turtle
