= Saint-Leu, Réunion =

Saint-Leu
- Commune
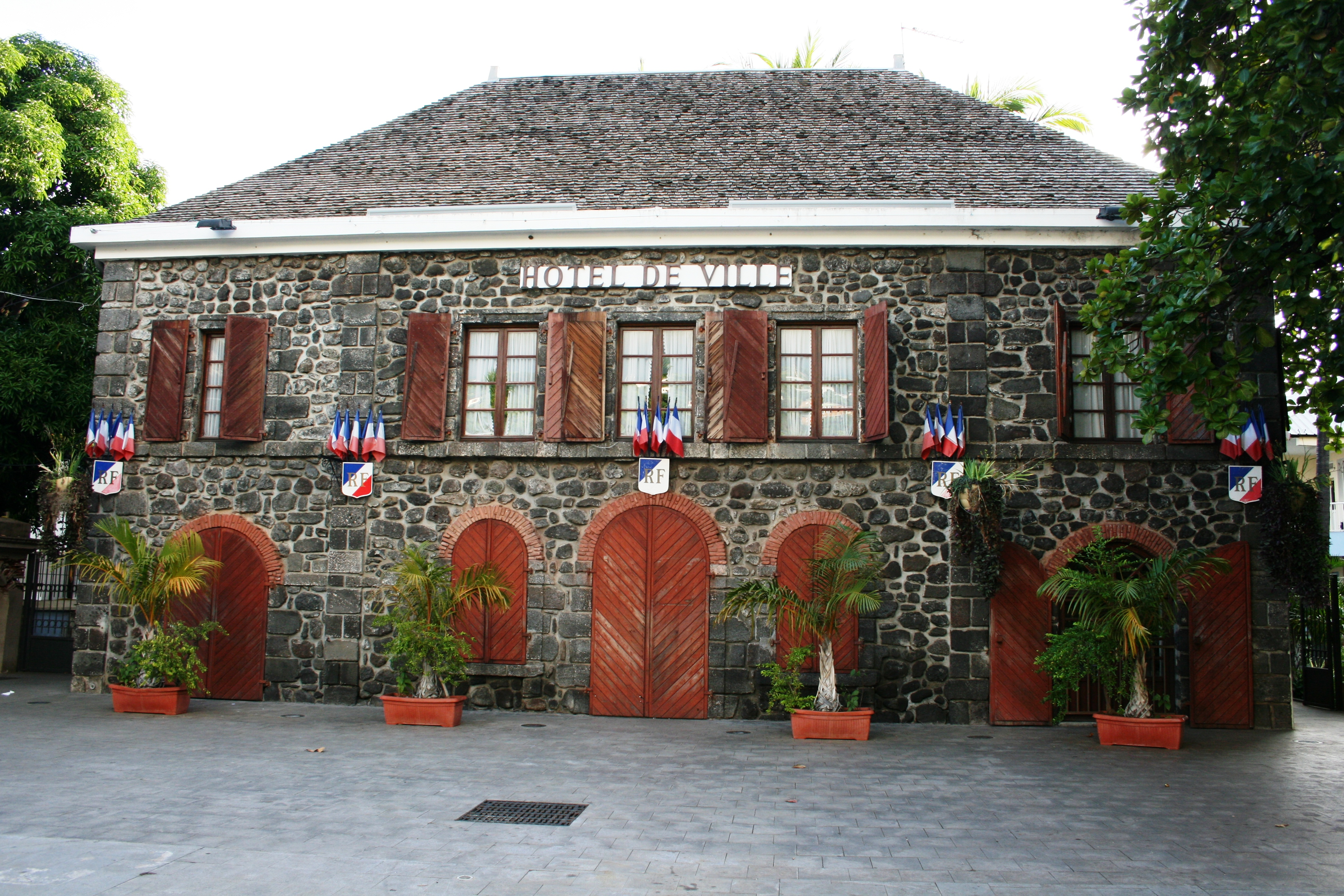
- The Hôtel de Ville

- Coat of arms

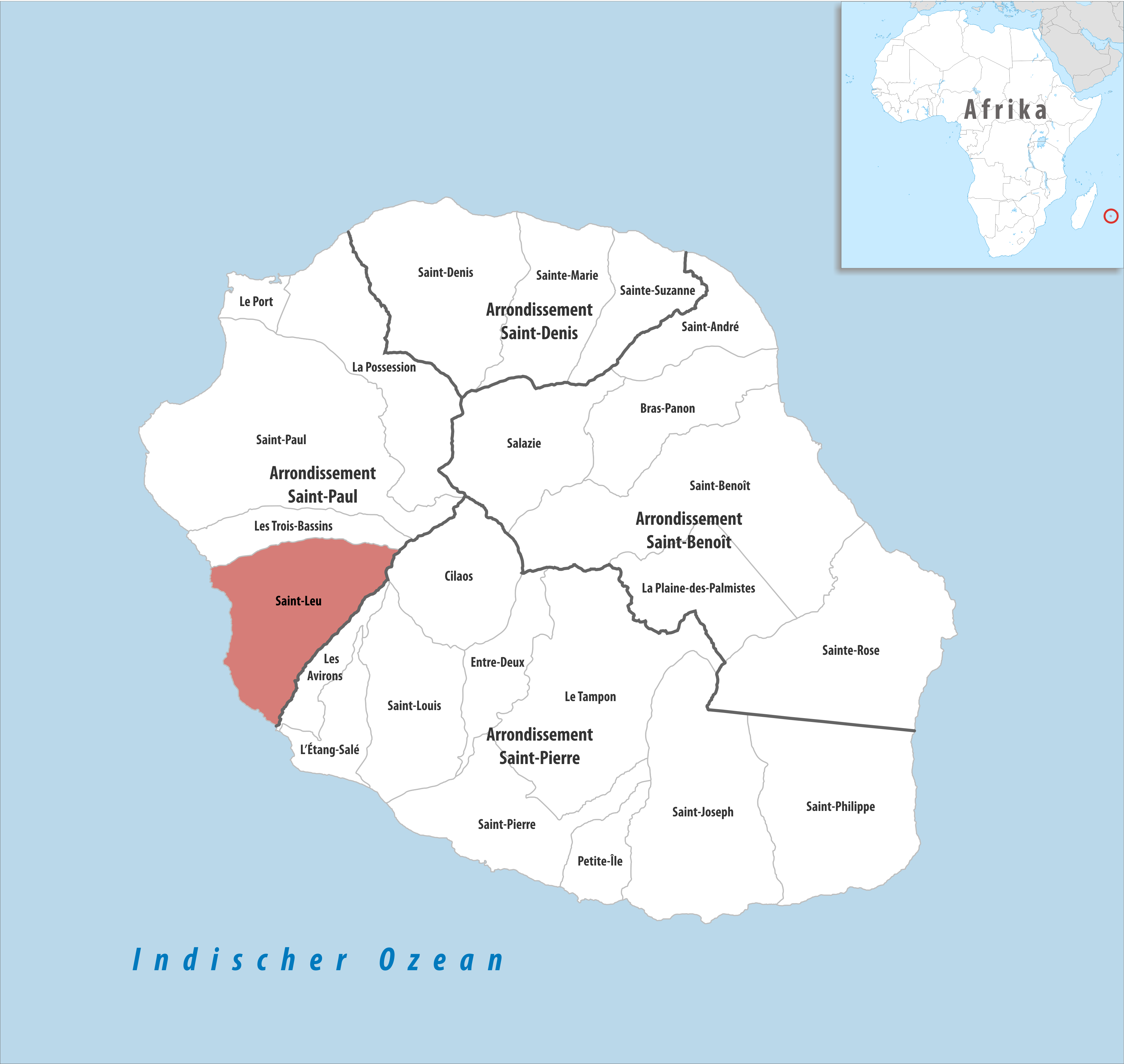
- Location of Saint-Leu
- Coordinates: 21°09′59″S 55°17′13″E
- Country: France
- Overseas region and department: Réunion
- Arrondissement: Saint-Paul
- Canton: Saint-Leu and L'Étang-Salé
- Intercommunality: Territoire de la Côte Ouest

Government
  - Mayor (2020–2026): Bruno Domen
- Area^{1}: 118.37 km^{2} (45.70 sq mi)
- Elevation: 4 m (13 ft)
- Highest elevation: 2,782 m (9,127 ft)
- Lowest elevation: 0 m (0 ft)
- Population (2023): 36,163
  - Density: 305.51/km^{2} (791.26/sq mi)
- Time zone: UTC+04:00
- INSEE/Postal code: 97413 /97436
- Website: saintleu.re
- ^{1} French Land Register data, which excludes lakes, ponds, glaciers > 1 km^{2} (0.386 sq mi or 247 acres) and river estuaries.

Saint-Leu (French pronunciation: [sɛ̃ lø]) is a commune in the French overseas department of Réunion. It is located on the west coast of the island of Réunion.

== History ==
The Hôtel de Ville was remodelled, with an extra floor, in 1847.

== Geography ==
=== Climate ===
Saint-Leu has a humid subtropical climate (Köppen climate classification Cwa) closely bordering on a subtropical highland climate (Cwb). The average annual temperature in Saint-Leu is 19.2 °C (66.6 °F). The average annual rainfall is 1,068.8 mm (42.08 in) with January as the wettest month. The temperatures are highest on average in February, at around 22.2 °C (72.0 °F), and lowest in August, at around 16.4 °C (61.5 °F). The highest temperature ever recorded in Saint-Leu was 30.9 °C (87.6 °F) on 10 January 2007; the coldest temperature ever recorded was 8.5 °C (47.3 °F) on 10 September 1975.

Climate data for Saint-Leu (altitude 429m, 1991–2020 normals, extremes 2002–present)
Month	Jan	Feb	Mar	Apr	May	Jun	Jul	Aug	Sep	Oct	Nov	Dec	Year
Record high °C (°F)	34.1 (93.4)	33.3 (91.9)	32.8 (91.0)	31.0 (87.8)	29.6 (85.3)	29.0 (84.2)	27.8 (82.0)	27.1 (80.8)	27.9 (82.2)	29.7 (85.5)	31.7 (89.1)	33.1 (91.6)	34.1 (93.4)
Mean daily maximum °C (°F)	28.0 (82.4)	28.2 (82.8)	27.8 (82.0)	26.9 (80.4)	25.3 (77.5)	23.7 (74.7)	22.9 (73.2)	22.9 (73.2)	23.5 (74.3)	24.5 (76.1)	25.8 (78.4)	27.3 (81.1)	25.6 (78.1)
Daily mean °C (°F)	24.3 (75.7)	24.4 (75.9)	24.0 (75.2)	23.1 (73.6)	21.4 (70.5)	19.8 (67.6)	18.9 (66.0)	18.9 (66.0)	19.4 (66.9)	20.5 (68.9)	21.8 (71.2)	23.4 (74.1)	21.7 (71.1)
Mean daily minimum °C (°F)	20.6 (69.1)	20.7 (69.3)	20.3 (68.5)	19.2 (66.6)	17.6 (63.7)	15.9 (60.6)	15.0 (59.0)	14.8 (58.6)	15.3 (59.5)	16.5 (61.7)	17.9 (64.2)	19.5 (67.1)	17.8 (64.0)
Record low °C (°F)	17.4 (63.3)	17.8 (64.0)	16.6 (61.9)	16.0 (60.8)	13.8 (56.8)	12.7 (54.9)	11.9 (53.4)	12.0 (53.6)	12.6 (54.7)	11.3 (52.3)	14.0 (57.2)	16.6 (61.9)	11.3 (52.3)
Average precipitation mm (inches)	211.9 (8.34)	195.1 (7.68)	178.3 (7.02)	101.7 (4.00)	36.2 (1.43)	38.1 (1.50)	23.3 (0.92)	20.8 (0.82)	25.9 (1.02)	20.5 (0.81)	55.8 (2.20)	90.9 (3.58)	998.5 (39.31)
Average precipitation days (≥ 1.0 mm)	12.7	12.1	10.7	7.4	4.5	3.3	3.3	2.5	3.0	3.2	5.4	8.6	76.7
Source: Météo-France

Climate data for Saint-Leu (Mascarin, altitude 520m, 1981–2010 normals, extremes 1992–2016)
Month	Jan	Feb	Mar	Apr	May	Jun	Jul	Aug	Sep	Oct	Nov	Dec	Year
Record high °C (°F)	33.3 (91.9)	32.3 (90.1)	32.1 (89.8)	29.6 (85.3)	28.3 (82.9)	29.2 (84.6)	25.3 (77.5)	26.8 (80.2)	26.9 (80.4)	30.1 (86.2)	31.2 (88.2)	32.2 (90.0)	33.3 (91.9)
Mean daily maximum °C (°F)	27.6 (81.7)	27.6 (81.7)	27.1 (80.8)	25.9 (78.6)	24.2 (75.6)	22.4 (72.3)	21.6 (70.9)	21.8 (71.2)	22.6 (72.7)	23.5 (74.3)	25.0 (77.0)	26.7 (80.1)	24.7 (76.5)
Daily mean °C (°F)	23.7 (74.7)	23.9 (75.0)	23.2 (73.8)	22.0 (71.6)	20.3 (68.5)	18.5 (65.3)	17.6 (63.7)	17.7 (63.9)	18.4 (65.1)	19.4 (66.9)	20.8 (69.4)	22.6 (72.7)	20.7 (69.3)
Mean daily minimum °C (°F)	19.9 (67.8)	20.1 (68.2)	19.3 (66.7)	18.1 (64.6)	16.4 (61.5)	14.5 (58.1)	13.6 (56.5)	13.6 (56.5)	14.2 (57.6)	15.3 (59.5)	16.7 (62.1)	18.6 (65.5)	16.7 (62.1)
Record low °C (°F)	16.8 (62.2)	16.1 (61.0)	16.3 (61.3)	14.1 (57.4)	12.4 (54.3)	11.4 (52.5)	10.0 (50.0)	11.0 (51.8)	10.7 (51.3)	11.4 (52.5)	12.8 (55.0)	15.5 (59.9)	10.0 (50.0)
Average precipitation mm (inches)	161.6 (6.36)	197.7 (7.78)	124.6 (4.91)	65.4 (2.57)	38.5 (1.52)	27.1 (1.07)	19.1 (0.75)	17.7 (0.70)	18.8 (0.74)	17.7 (0.70)	30.6 (1.20)	90.6 (3.57)	809.4 (31.87)
Average precipitation days (≥ 1.0 mm)	10.9	11.2	8.4	6.0	3.9	2.2	2.4	2.5	2.7	3.0	4.7	7.5	65.2
Source: Météo-France

Climate data for Saint-Leu (Colimacons, altitude 798m, 1991–2020 normals, extremes 1964–present)
Month	Jan	Feb	Mar	Apr	May	Jun	Jul	Aug	Sep	Oct	Nov	Dec	Year
Record high °C (°F)	30.9 (87.6)	30.0 (86.0)	29.4 (84.9)	28.8 (83.8)	28.1 (82.6)	28.0 (82.4)	25.2 (77.4)	24.6 (76.3)	25.0 (77.0)	28.0 (82.4)	29.9 (85.8)	30.1 (86.2)	30.9 (87.6)
Mean daily maximum °C (°F)	25.3 (77.5)	25.5 (77.9)	25.1 (77.2)	24.3 (75.7)	22.8 (73.0)	21.1 (70.0)	20.3 (68.5)	20.1 (68.2)	20.5 (68.9)	21.5 (70.7)	22.7 (72.9)	24.3 (75.7)	22.8 (73.0)
Daily mean °C (°F)	21.9 (71.4)	22.2 (72.0)	21.7 (71.1)	20.8 (69.4)	19.2 (66.6)	17.4 (63.3)	16.6 (61.9)	16.4 (61.5)	16.8 (62.2)	17.9 (64.2)	19.2 (66.6)	20.9 (69.6)	19.2 (66.6)
Mean daily minimum °C (°F)	18.6 (65.5)	18.9 (66.0)	18.4 (65.1)	17.3 (63.1)	15.5 (59.9)	13.8 (56.8)	12.9 (55.2)	12.7 (54.9)	13.2 (55.8)	14.2 (57.6)	15.6 (60.1)	17.4 (63.3)	15.7 (60.3)
Record low °C (°F)	14.6 (58.3)	13.5 (56.3)	14.0 (57.2)	12.5 (54.5)	9.0 (48.2)	10.0 (50.0)	8.8 (47.8)	9.0 (48.2)	8.5 (47.3)	9.7 (49.5)	10.9 (51.6)	13.5 (56.3)	8.5 (47.3)
Average precipitation mm (inches)	240.1 (9.45)	227.5 (8.96)	172.1 (6.78)	78.6 (3.09)	36.1 (1.42)	29.8 (1.17)	20.5 (0.81)	21.6 (0.85)	19.8 (0.78)	32.2 (1.27)	56.6 (2.23)	133.9 (5.27)	1,068.8 (42.08)
Average precipitation days (≥ 1.0 mm)	15.1	13.6	11.2	7.4	4.2	2.8	3.1	3.2	3.2	5.2	8.1	11.1	88.1
Mean monthly sunshine hours	133.9	120.7	138.0	141.1	163.9	166.3	172.6	162.2	140.2	129.5	129.2	124.5	1,722.2
Source 1: Météo-France
Source 2: Meteociel.fr (sunshine 1981-2010)

== Population ==
Historical population
Year	Pop.	±% p.a.
1961	16,137	—
1967	16,870	+0.74%
1974	17,396	+0.44%
1982	18,207	+0.57%
1990	20,931	+1.76%
1999	25,314	+2.13%
2007	29,422	+1.90%
2012	32,971	+2.30%
2017	33,576	+0.36%
2023	36,163	+1.24%
Source: SPLAF and INSEE (1967-2023)

== Sports ==
=== Surf ===
It is a well-known surf spot. Various surfing competitions have been held in Saint-Leu, including World Qualifying Series (WQS) and ASP World Tour (WCT) competitions. It is well known for its famous left wave.

=== Paragliding ===
There is a paragliding base at Colimaçons. Paragliding World Cup races have been held in Saint-Leu in 2003 and 2006, and Pre World Cup Tour race in 2010 and 2015. In 2016 the city will held again a Paragliding World Cup race (October 2016).

== Points of interest ==
- Conservatoire botanique national de Mascarin
- Kélonia Marine Turtle Station
- Museum Stella Matutina

=== Neighborhoods of Saint Leu ===
- Downtown Saint-Leu
- Chaloupe Saint-Leu
- Pointe au Sel
- Bras Mouton;
- Bac en fer
- Cap Saint-Leu
- La Fontaine
- L'Etang Saint-Leu
- La Pointe des Châteaux
- Les Colimaçons
- Le Plate
- Grand Fond
- Stella Matutina
- Le Portail
- Piton Saint-Leu

== Gallery ==
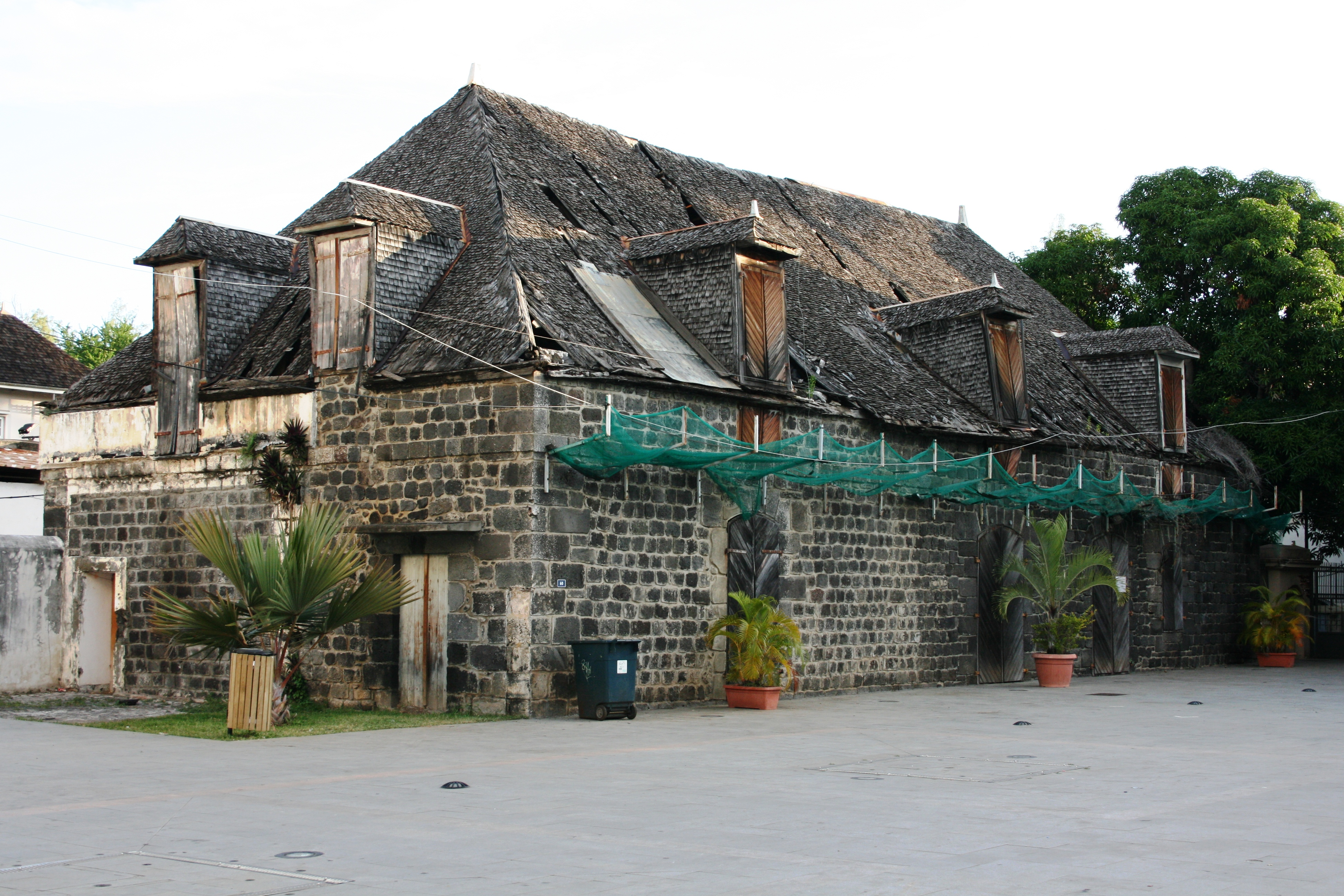

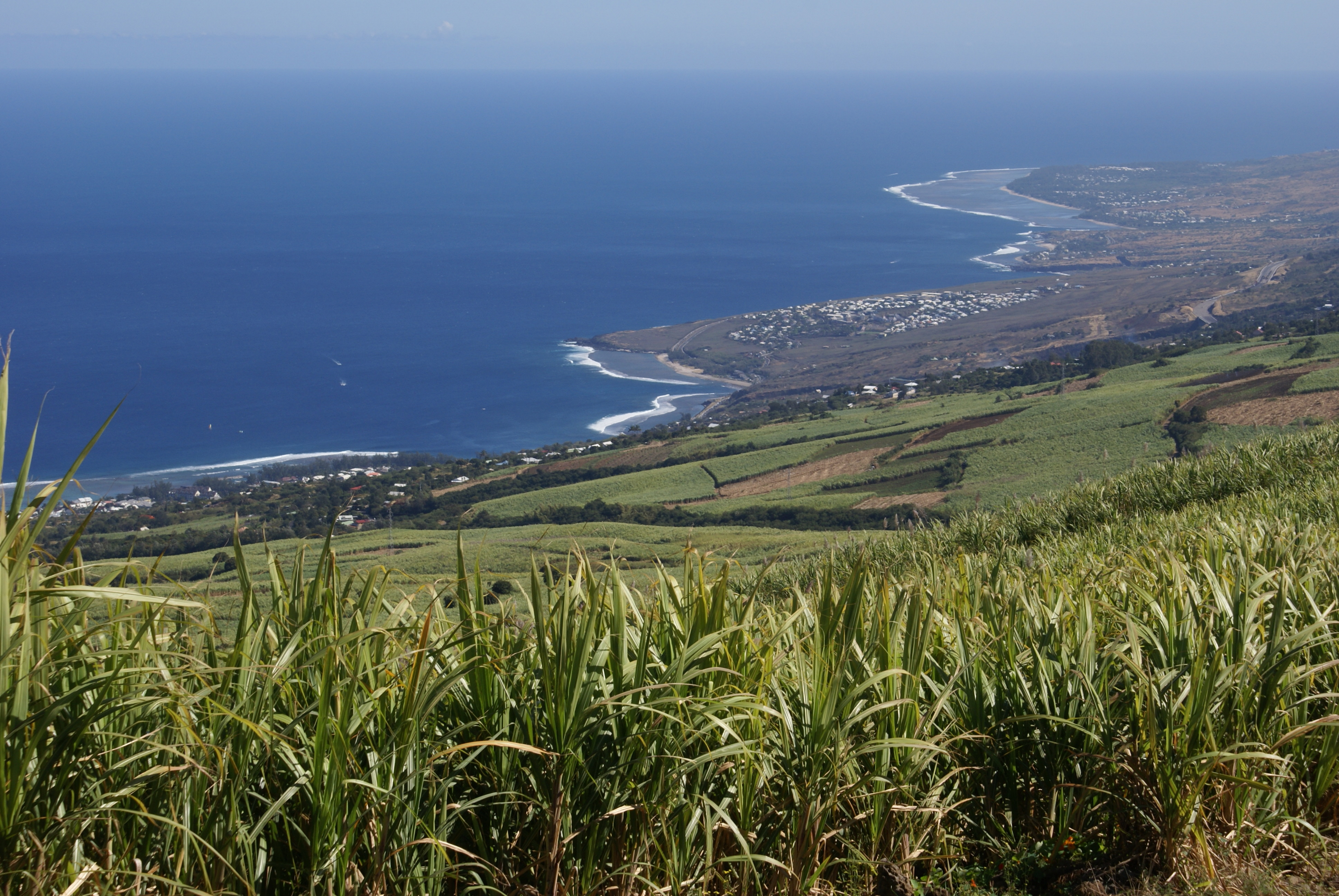

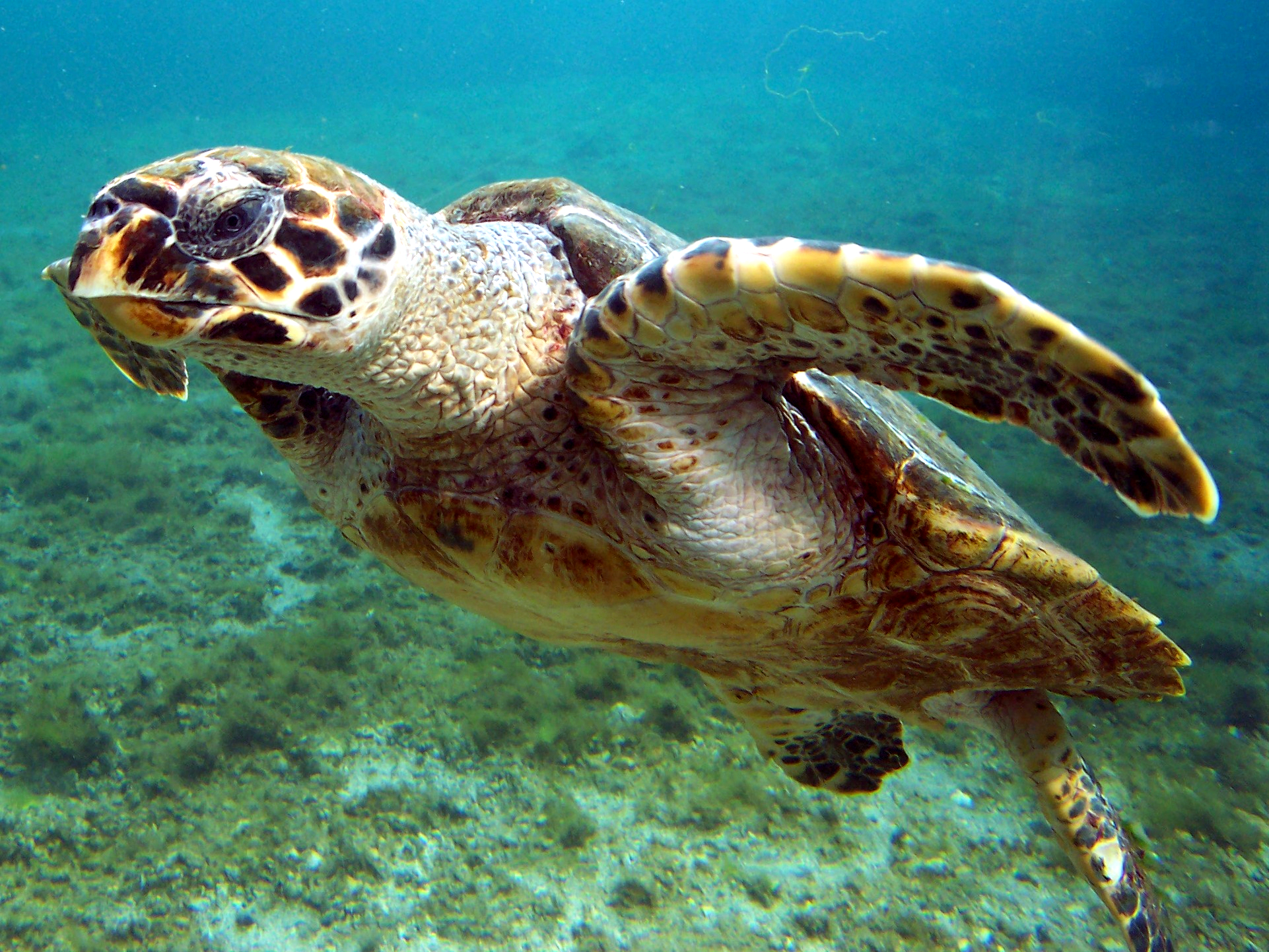

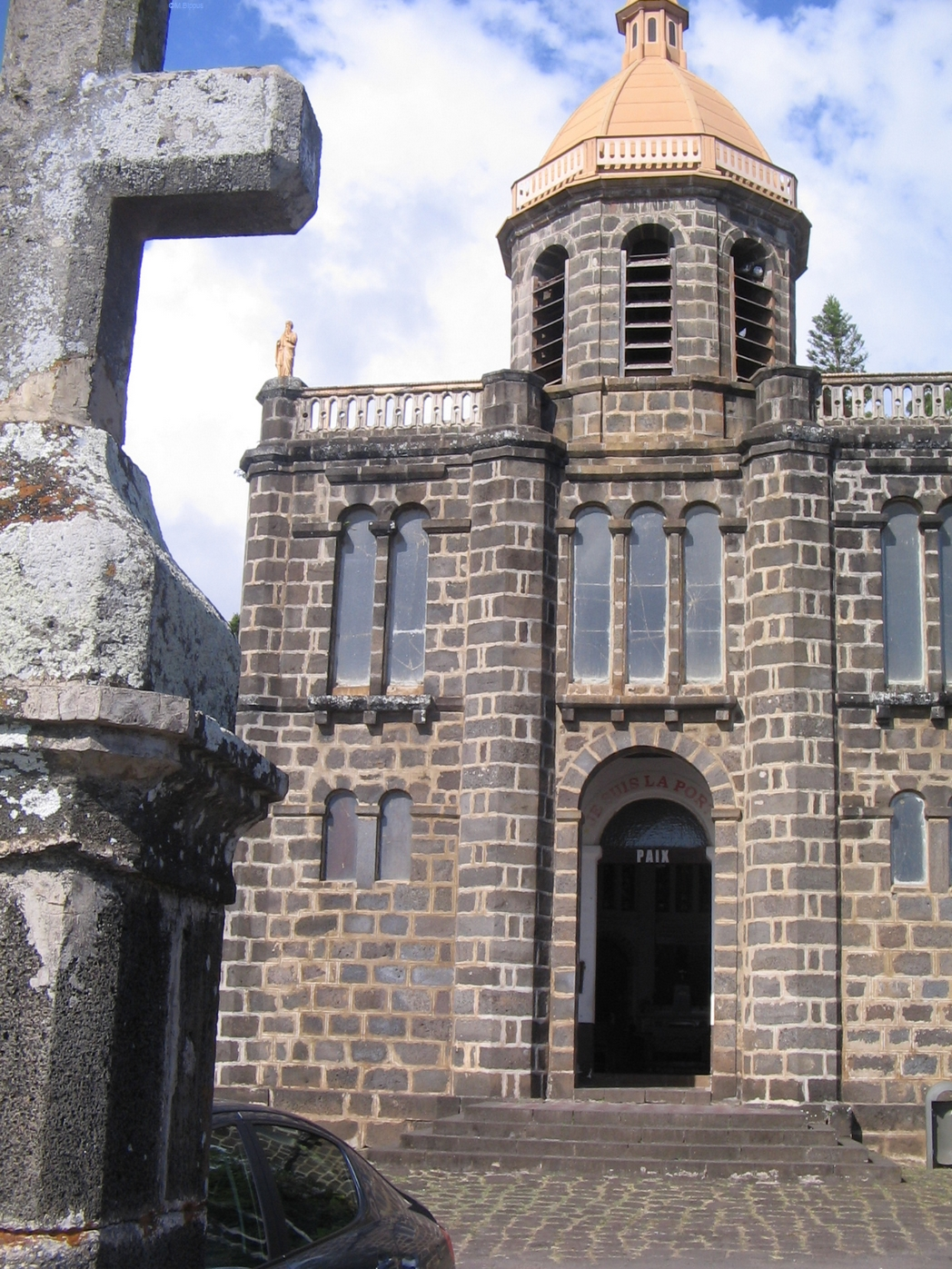

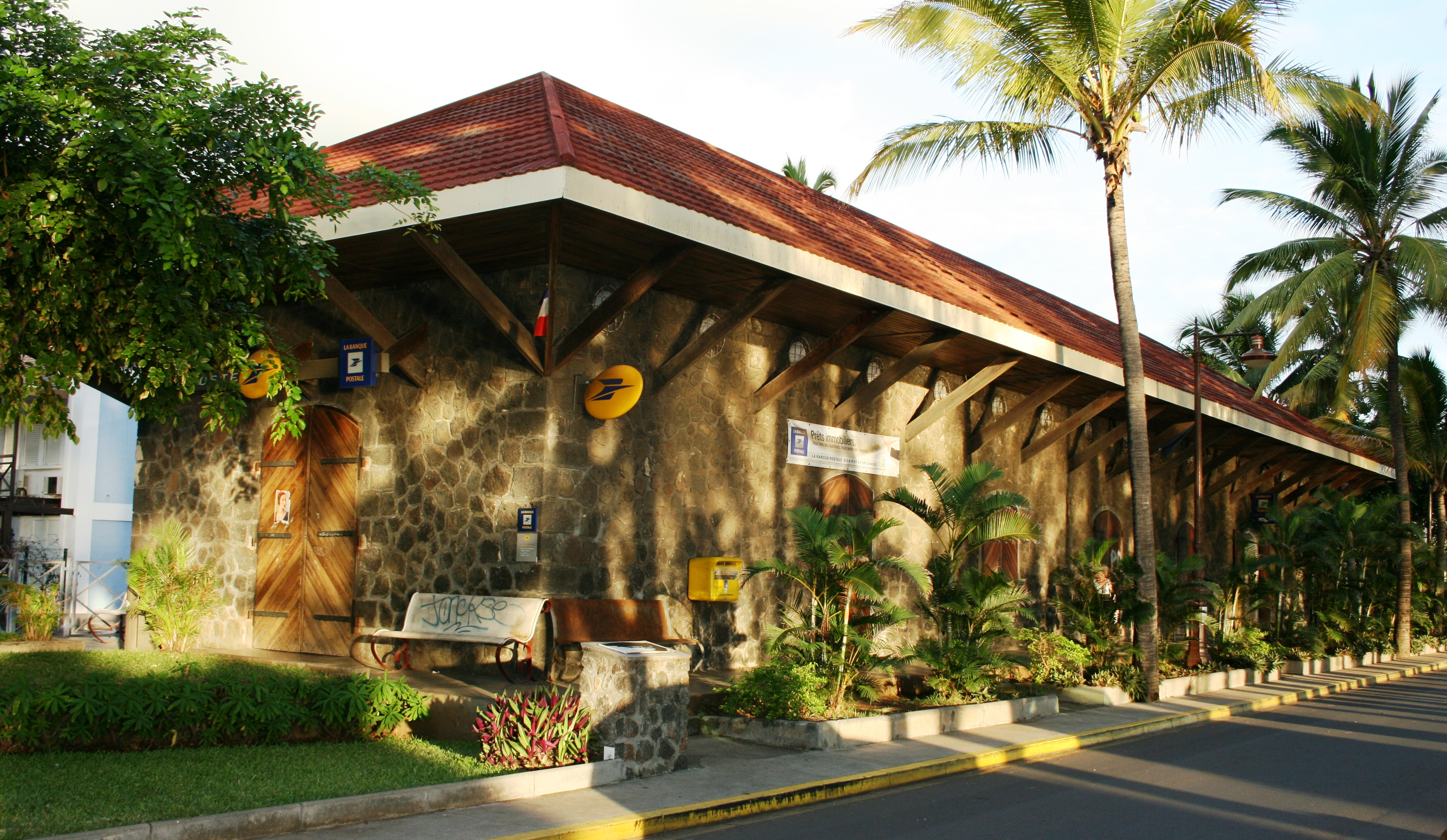

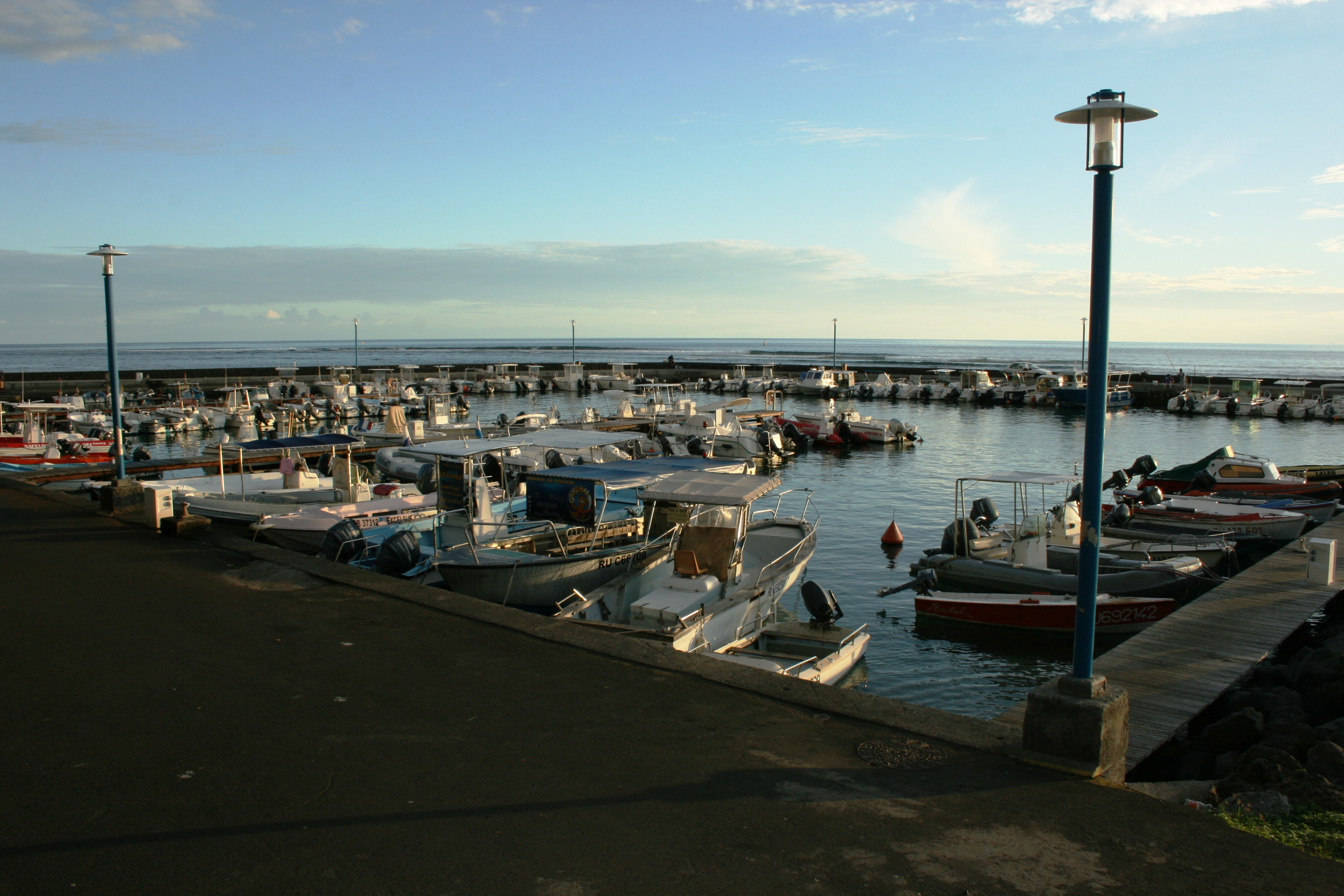

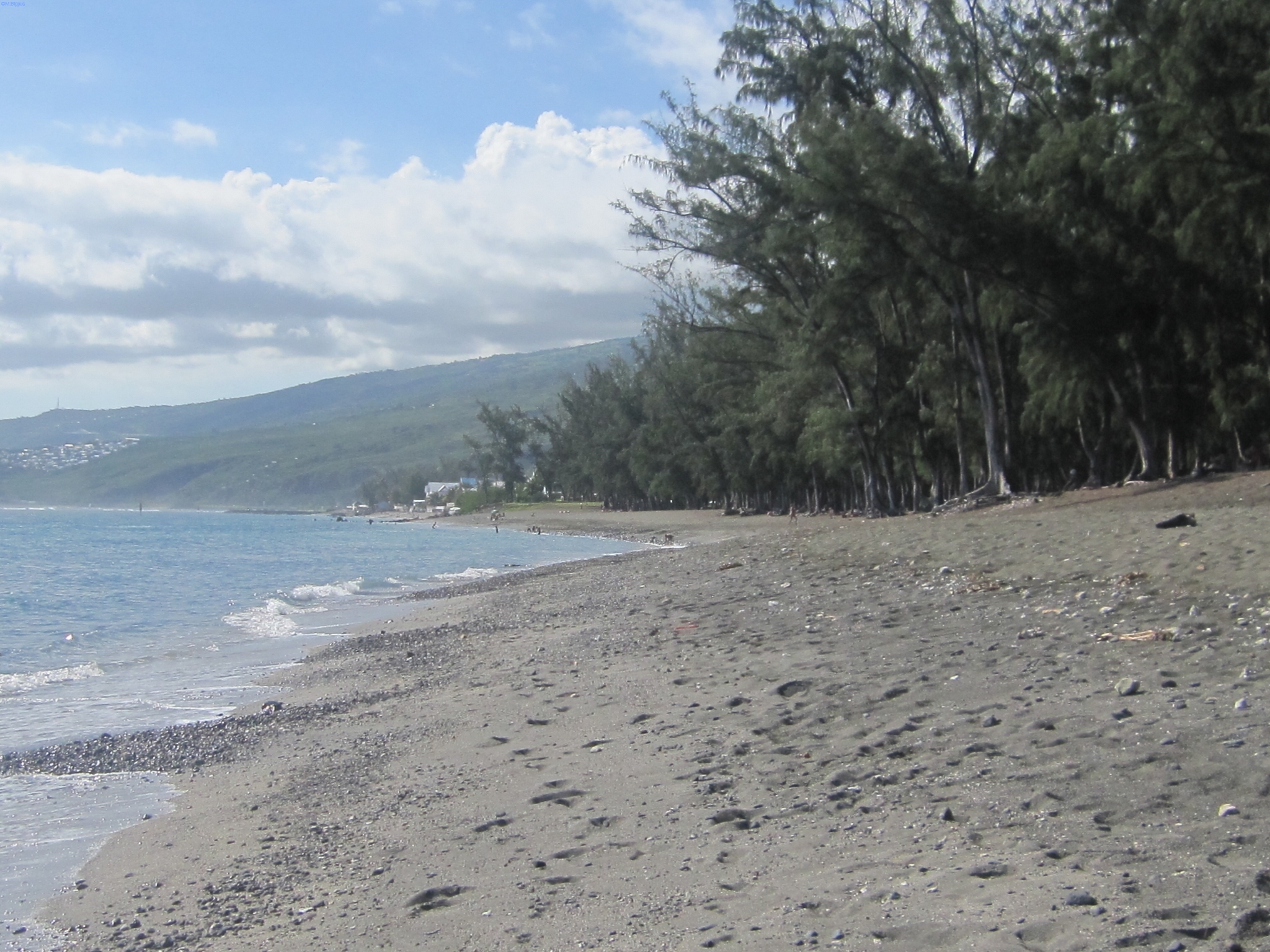

== See also ==
- Communes of the Réunion department
