= Hôtel de Ville, Saint-Leu, Réunion =

Town hall in Saint-Leu, Réunion, France

Hôtel de Ville
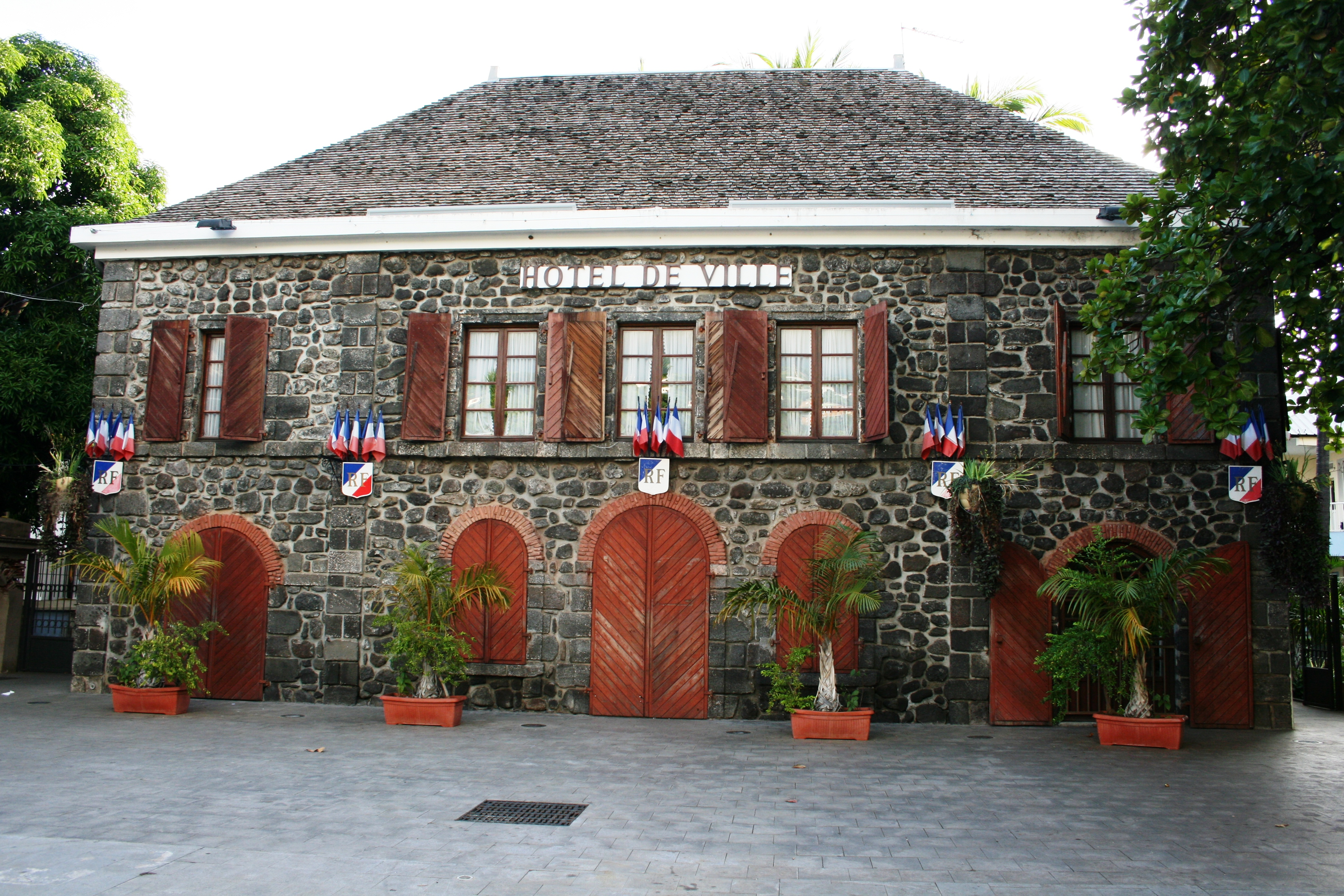
- The main frontage of the Hôtel de Ville in May 2011
- Interactive map of the Hôtel de Ville area

General information
- Type: City hall
- Architectural style: Neoclassical style
- Location: Saint-Leu, Réunion, France
- Coordinates: 21.1662°S 55.2869°E
- Completed: 1847

The Hôtel de Ville (French pronunciation: [otɛl də vil], City Hall) is a municipal building in Saint-Leu, Réunion, in the Indian Ocean, standing on Place Raymond Vergès.

== History ==
The building was commissioned by the French Indies Company as a single-storey coffee store in the first half of the 18th century. The town was elevated to the status of a commune in 1790 and, after five years of prosperity during which the island exported more than 2,000 tonnes of coffee per year, King Charles X granted the building to the commune for municipal use in 1829. The building was used as a police station as well as a municipal office and, to accommodate an increasing number of council staff, it was remodelled as a two storey-building between 1821 and 1847.

The design involved a symmetrical main frontage of five bays facing onto the town square (now Place Raymond Vergès). The building was built in basalt stone with a cement render finish. The central section of three bays, which were set close together, featured a round headed doorway with a fanlight flanked by two narrow round headed windows. The outer bays also contained round headed doorways with fanlights. The first floor was fenestrated by five square headed casement windows with voussoirs and the building featured an unusual double-roof. An inner courtyard was created within the building where the horses could be watered.

A monument to commemorate the slave revolt which took place in November 1811, during a brief period of British rule, was designed by Richard Vildeman and unveiled on the north side of the square, in front of the town hall, in November 2011. The revolt had left 20 slaves dead, 30 sentenced to death, and many others imprisoned. The memorial took the form of a curved wall, with a series of niches containing stone heads, representing some of the slaves who died in the revolt.
