= Pond turtle =

Pond turtle may refer to:

- Emydidae, a family of pond turtles
  - Emys, a genus of Emydidae
    - European pond turtle (Emys orbicularis)
    - Sicilian pond turtle (Emys trinacris)
    - Western pond turtle (Actinemys marmorata or Emys marmorata)
- Giant Asian pond turtle (Heosemys grandis)
- Mauremys, a genus of pond turtles
  - Chinese pond turtle (Mauremys reevesii)
  - Japanese pond turtle (Mauremys japonica)
- Philippine forest turtle or Leyte pond turtle (Heosemys leytensis)
