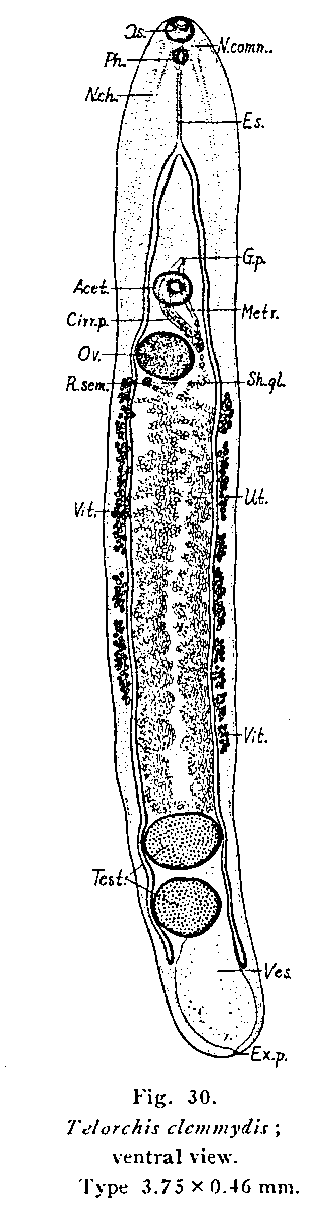

Scientific classification
- Kingdom: Animalia
- Phylum: Platyhelminthes
- Class: Trematoda
- Order: Plagiorchiida
- Family: Telorchiidae
- Genus: Telorchis
- Species: T. clemmydis

Binomial name
- Telorchis clemmydis Yamaguti, 1933

= Telorchis clemmydis =

Species of fluke

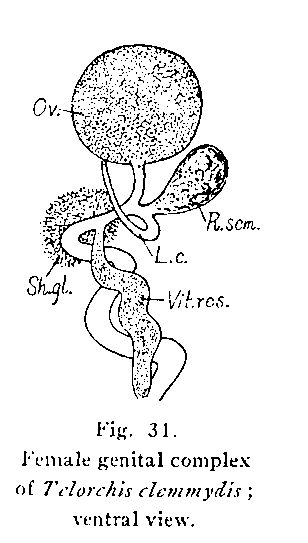
The female genitalia of Telorchis clemmydis

Telorchis clemmydis is a species of flukes in the genus Telorchis found in Asian freshwater turtles, mainly of the family Geoemydidae.

== Host species ==
- Mauremys japonica (gall bladder and intestines)
- Cuora amboinensis (intestine)
- Heosemys grandis (intestine)
- Mauremys reevesii (intestine)
- Orlitia borneensis (intestine)
