= Mauremys glyphistoma =

Conservation status
- Data Deficient (IUCN 3.1)

Scientific classification
- Kingdom: Animalia
- Phylum: Chordata
- Class: Reptilia
- Order: Testudines
- Suborder: Cryptodira
- Family: Geoemydidae
- Genus: Mauremys
- Species: M. × glyphistoma

Binomial name
- Mauremys × glyphistoma McCord & Iverson, 1994

Synonyms
- Mauremys annamensis × Mauremys sinensis; Ocadia glyphistoma McCord & Iverson, 1994

Species of turtle

"Mauremys" glyphistoma is a hybrid turtle in the family Geoemydidae (formerly Bataguridae). Originally described as a new species supposedly endemic to Guangxi/China; it was classified as Data Deficient in the IUCN Red List.

It is known only from a few specimens including the type series, all from the pet trade supposedly from Guangxi or Vietnam. Either found in the wild or bred for the pet trade, it was later determined to be the offspring of a male Chinese stripe-necked turtle and a female Vietnamese pond turtle (Spinks et al. (2004), Stuart & Parham (2006)). If it is a wild-born hybrid, the specimen thus must have originated in central Vietnam, the only area where Mauremys annamensis is known to exist and overlaps with the range of Mauremys sinensis.

== See also ==
- Mauremys iversoni the Fujian pond turtle
- Mauremys pritchardi
- Mauremys philippeni
