= Mauremys pritchardi =

Scientific classification
- Kingdom: Animalia
- Phylum: Chordata
- Class: Reptilia
- Order: Testudines
- Suborder: Cryptodira
- Family: Geoemydidae
- Genus: Mauremys
- Species: M. pritchardi

Binomial name
- Mauremys pritchardi McCord, 1997

Synonyms
- Mauremys mutica × Mauremys reevesii

Species of turtle

Mauremys pritchardi is an interspecific hybrid turtle in the family Geoemydidae. M. pritchardi, described to be from Myanmar (where neither of the parental species occurs apparently), has been found in the wild in China and Japan, and is produced to some extent in Chinese turtle farms. It was listed as data deficient in the IUCN Red List before its actual origin became known.

The parents of this hybrid are the Chinese pond turtle (Mauremys reevesii ) and the Asian yellow pond turtle (Mauremys mutica). While it is not unusual for perfectly valid geoemydid species to arise from hybridization, recognition as a species would require that the hybrids be fertile and constitute a phenotypically distinct and self-sustaining lineage. This does not yet appear to be the case in this "species" as recently (Kosukawa et al. 2006) a population of these turtles has been found in Japan. The hybrid offspring are perfectly fertile, which is not the case in Mauremys iversoni for example, another intergeneric hybrid, and have been bred in captivity already, with all juveniles resembling their parents (and not the parental species) perfectly as well. Genetic studies verify its hybrid origin but scientists are unsure of the time of creation. According to Wink et al. 2001, it might well be a very ancient hybrid, while Parham et al. 2001 suppose that it is of rather recent origin.

== Etymology ==
The specific name, pritchardi, is in honour of British herpetologist Peter Pritchard.

== See also ==
- Fujian pond turtle
- Ocadia glyphistoma
- Ocadia philippeni
- Cuora serrata
