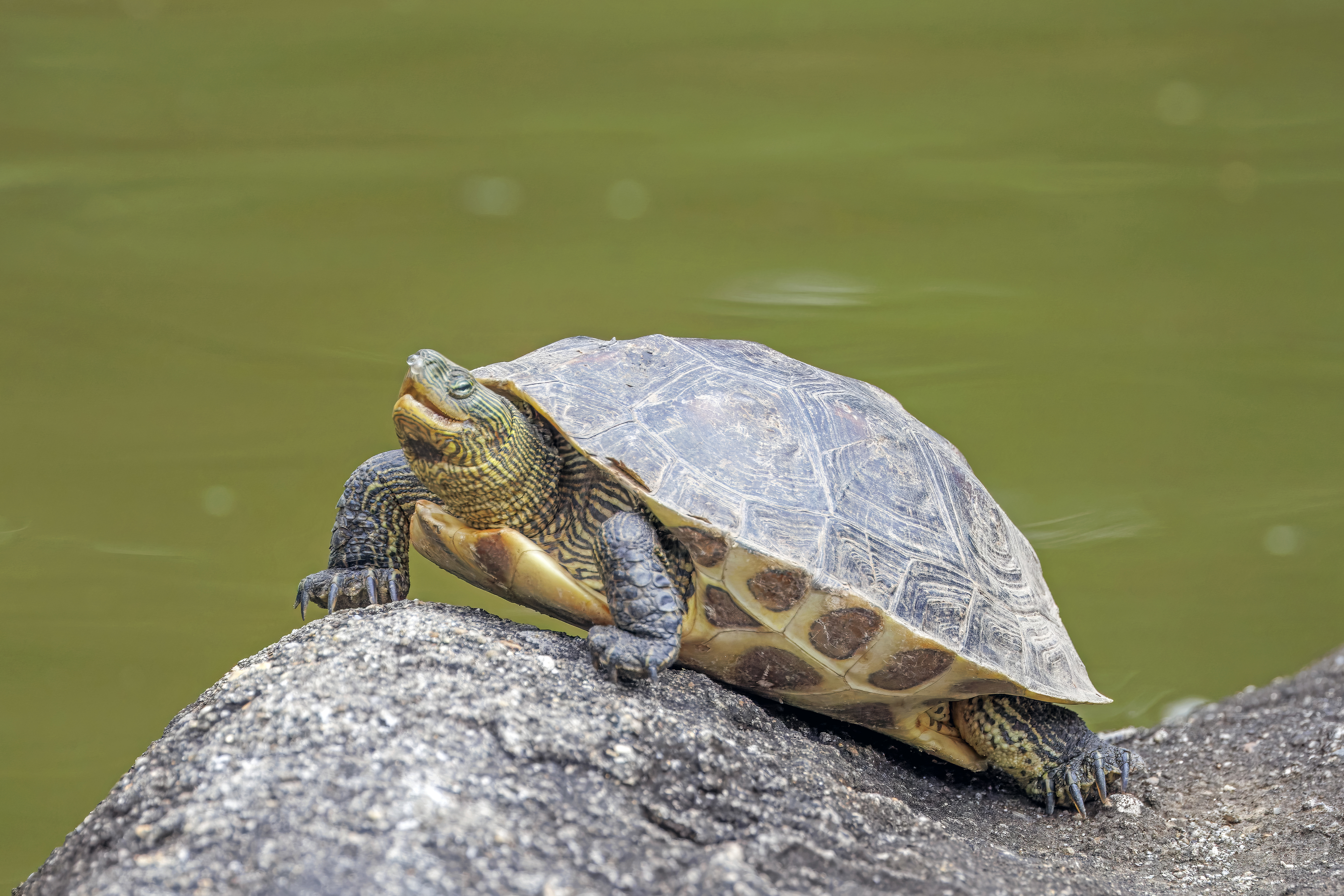
- Bach Ma National Park, Vietnam

Conservation status
- Critically Endangered (IUCN 3.1)

Scientific classification
- Kingdom: Animalia
- Phylum: Chordata
- Class: Reptilia
- Order: Testudines
- Suborder: Cryptodira
- Family: Geoemydidae
- Genus: Mauremys
- Species: M. sinensis

Binomial name
- Mauremys sinensis (Gray, 1870)

Synonyms
- Ocadia sinensis Gray, 1870; Emys sinensis Gray, 1834; Emys bennettii Gray, 1844; Graptemys sinensis Agassiz, 1857; Clemmys bennettii Strauch, 1862; Clemmys sinensis Strauch, 1862; Emys chinensis Gray, 1870 (ex errore); Mauremys sinensis Gray, 1870; Testudo anyangensis Ping, 1930; Pseudocadia anyangensis Lindholm, 1931; Mauremys sinensis changwui Tao, 1988; Mauremys sinensis sinensis Artner, 2003

= Chinese stripe-necked turtle =

Species of turtle

The Chinese stripe-necked turtle (Mauremys sinensis) or golden thread turtle, is a species of turtle in the family Geoemydidae. They are widely distributed in the subtropical regions of Taiwan.

Like many other Geoemydidae, this species hybridizes vigorously with related and not-so-closely related members of its family.

It is one of the two most commonly found species used for divination - the other being the yellow pond turtle - that have been recovered from Shang dynasty sites, despite the Shang capital being over 1000 km north of its modern-day distribution range.

== Description ==
Chinese-stripe-necked turtles have a green body. As a juvenile, its carapace is grayish green and there are three distinctive ridges. As an adult, the color fades to a brown color and the two ridges gradually disappear. The plastron is ivory in color with small black spots. The male's tail is more coarse and long, while adult females will be larger than the males(body length: male~20 cm, female~26 cm). Its diet are small animals (small shrimp, small fish, aquatic snail, mosquito larval...) and aquatic plant (duckweed, water spinach,...)

== Habitat ==
Chinese stripe-necked turtles prefer lowland waters such as ponds, canals, and slow-moving rivers. Climate is very important when sustaining a risk of invasion, since the turtles become naturalized in areas with a suitable climate.

== Distribution ==
The Chinese stripe-necked turtle is found in China (Hainan, Guangdong & Fujian), Taiwan and northern & central Vietnam. There were hatchlings in the Torre Flavia wetland (coast of central Italy). This resulted in the idea that there is naturalization of the local population.

== Conservation ==
Chinese stripe-necked turtles are protected by the CITES and IUCN, captive-breeding Chinese stripe-necked turtles are approved. Another reason that affects its population is the invasion of red-eared sliders. In Hong Kong, mainland China and Taiwan and in some other countries, it is a popular pet turtle.

The Denver Aquarium has a Chinese strip-necked turtles conservation program.

== Hybridization ==
In captivity, hybrids have been produced between this species and Japanese pond turtle, (Mauremys japonica) and the Chinese pond turtle, (Mauremys sinensis) as well as with a male Cyclemys (oldhami) shanensis. The supposed species Ocadia glyphistoma is a hybrid between a male M. sinensis and a female Vietnamese pond turtle, (Mauremys annamensis) a species nearly extinct in the wild. Ocadia philippeni was also shown to be of hybrid origin, a male M. sinensis with a female Cuora trifasciata. Both are either naturally occurring or bred for the pet trade. Any individuals that are available as pets therefore need to be kept separate from other members of the family to prevent hybridization.

== Reproduction ==
After mating, the female turtle may lay 5-20 eggs that hatch about 60 days when needed.
