= Turtle farming =

Practice of raising turtles commercially

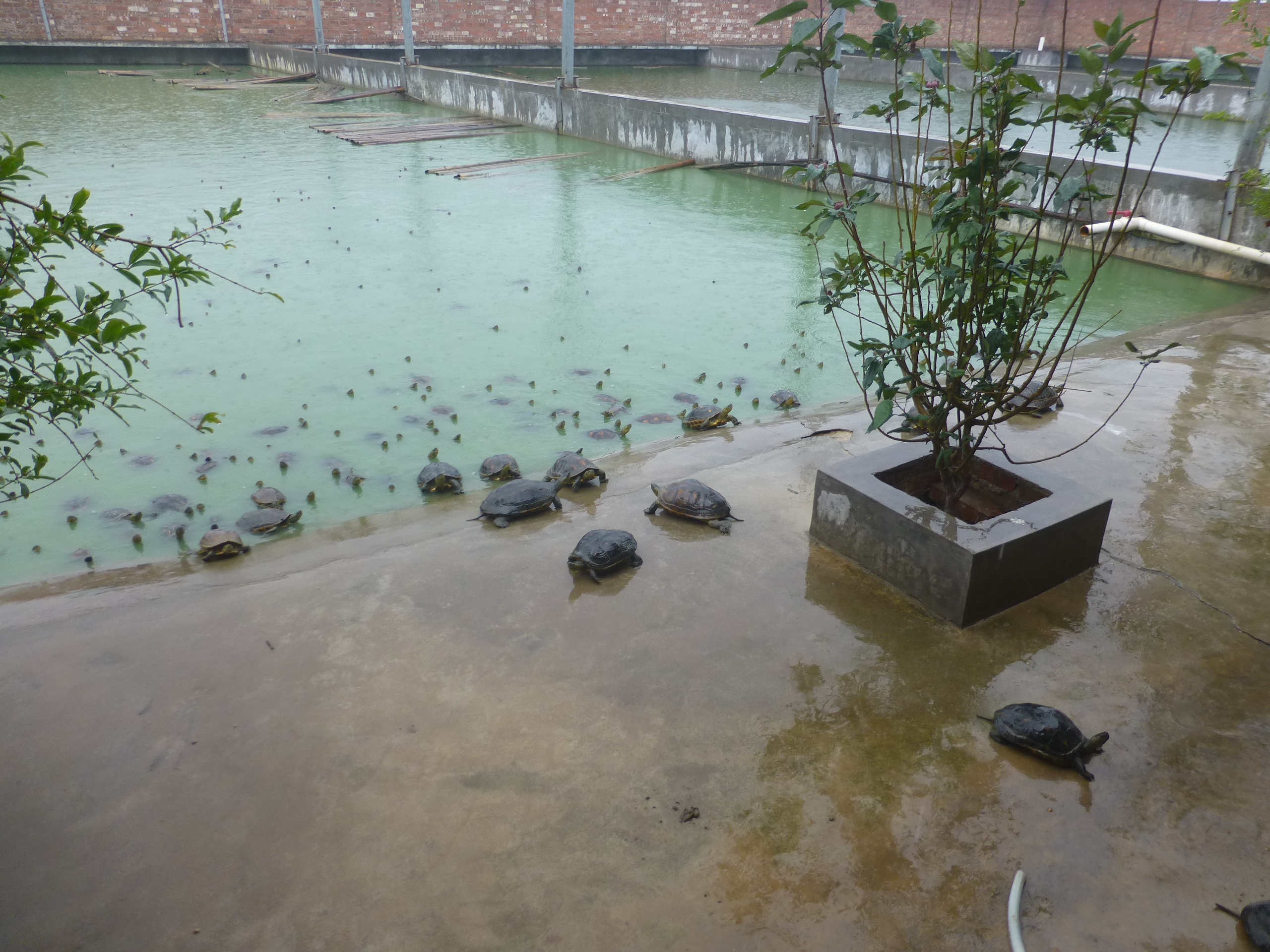
Turtles coming out of a pool at a turtle farm in South China, as the owner calls them by clapping her hands

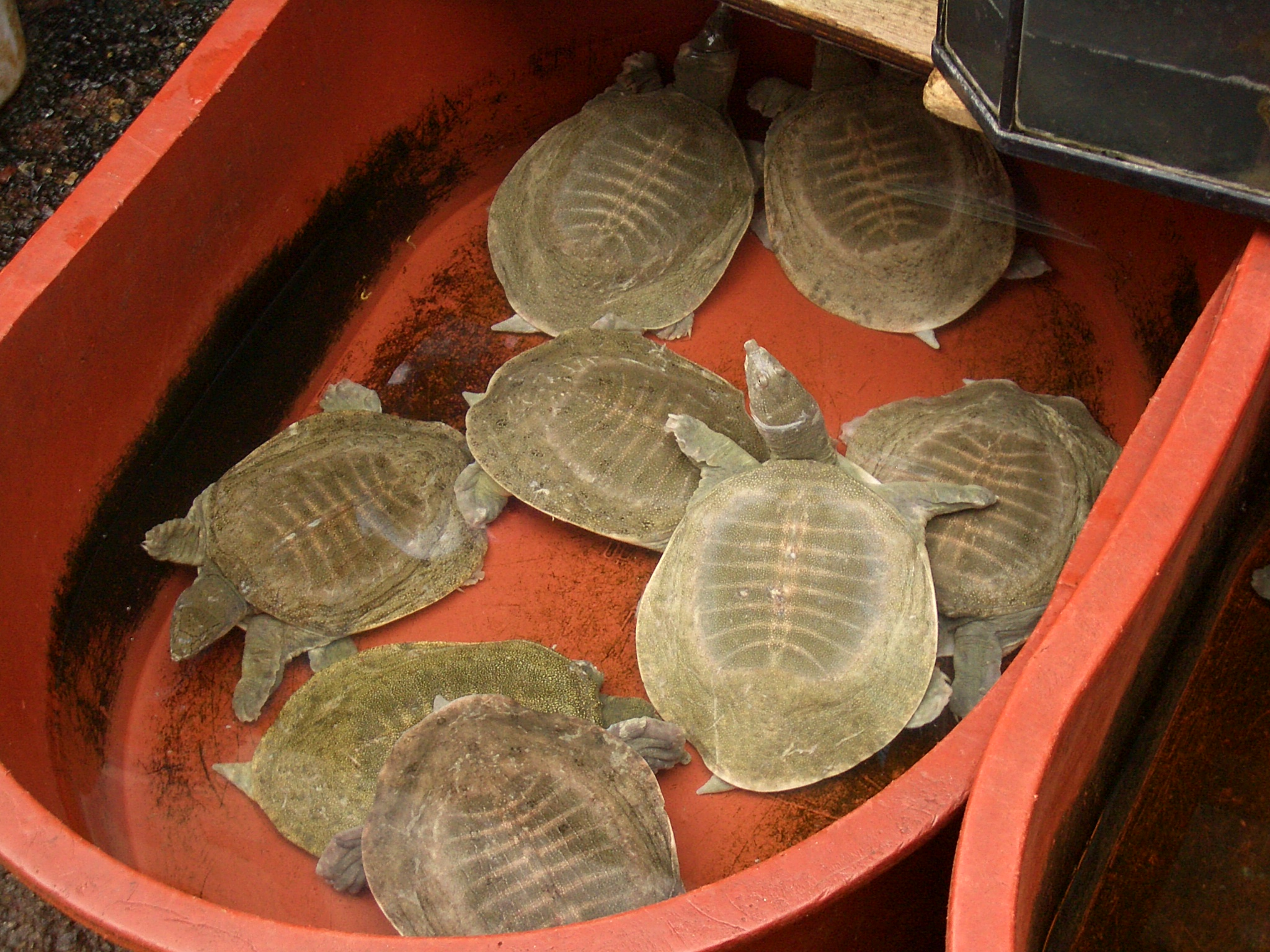
Chinese softshell turtle is the most common farmed turtle in Asia.

Turtle farming is the practice of raising turtles and tortoises of various species commercially. Raised animals are sold for use as gourmet food, traditional medicine ingredients, or as pets. Some farms also sell young animals to other farms, either as breeding stock, or more commonly to be raised there to a larger size for subsequent resale.

Turtle farms primarily raise freshwater turtles (primarily, Chinese softshell turtles as a food source and sliders and cooter turtles for the pet trade); therefore, turtle farming is usually classified as aquaculture. However, some terrestrial tortoises (e.g. Cuora mouhotii) are also raised on farms for the pet trade.

Only three serious attempts are believed to have been made to farm sea turtles. Only one of them, in Cayman Islands, continues to operate. The one in Australia's Torres Strait Islands folded after a few years of operation, and the one in Réunion has been converted to a public aquarium (Kélonia).

== Geography ==
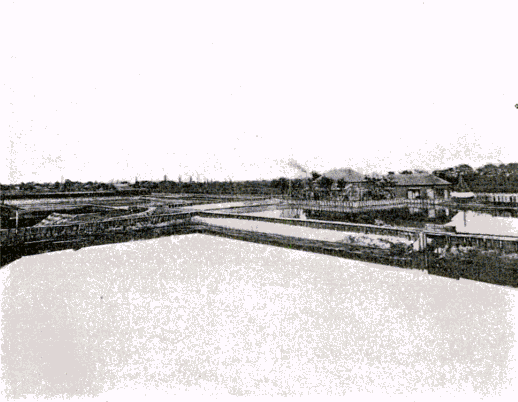
Hattori's farm in Fukagawa, likely the world's first industrial-scale turtle farm, about 1905

=== Japan ===
Japan is said to be the pioneer of softshelled turtle (Pelodiscus sinensis) farming, with the first farm started by Kurajiro Hatori in Fukagawa near Tokyo in 1866. Initially stocked with wild-caught animals, the farm started breeding them in 1875. By the early 20th century, Hattori's farm had about 13.6 hectares of turtle ponds; it was reported to produce 82,000 eggs in 1904, and 60,000 animals of market size in 1907.

According to the report of the Japanese zoologist Kakichi Mitsukuri, who conducted a significant amount of research at Hattori's farm in the late 19th and early 20th centuries, the main food supplied to the turtles was crushed bivalve mollusks, Mactra veneriformis (シオフキガイ, shiofuki, in Japanese), from Tokyo Bay. This was supplemented with byproducts of fish processing and sericulture, as well as boiled wheat. The farm turtles lived in a symbiotic relationship with carp and eels, which were raised in the same ponds. The fish stirred up the mud, and the shy turtles felt more comfortable foraging in turbid water.

Hattori's company has survived into the 21st century, as the Hattori-Nakamura Soft-Shelled Turtle Farm, operating in Hamamatsu, Shizuoka Prefecture. According to a 1991 report, Japan's turtle farm industry continued to be mostly based in central Japan, but was expanding to the warmer southern parts of the country.

=== China ===
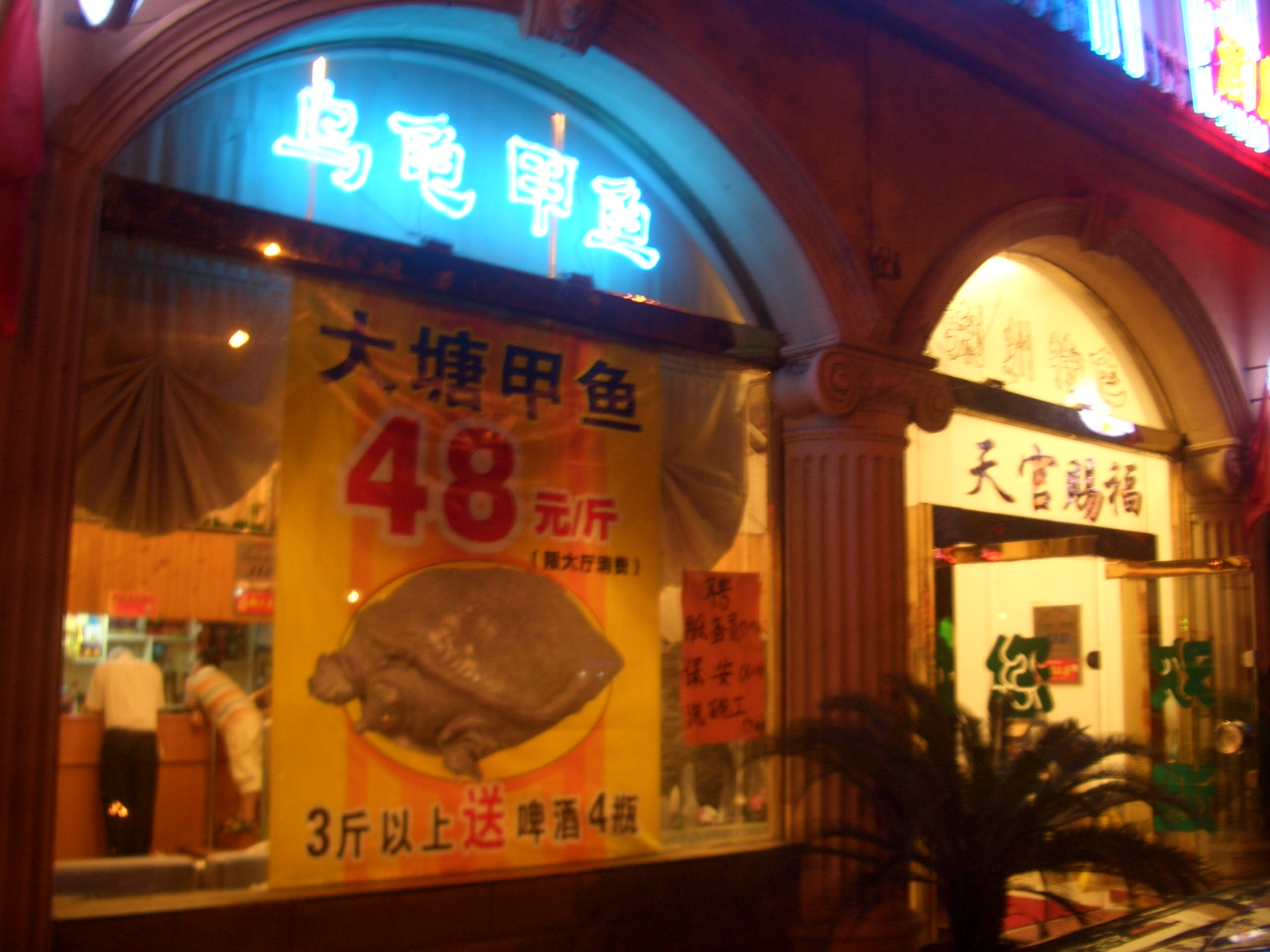
A Wuhan restaurant advertises softshell turtle (甲鱼). The sign mentions, "Order 3 or more pounds of turtle, get 4 bottles of beer free"

The majority of the world's turtle farms are probably located in China.

Ancient Chinese literature (Fan Li's The Art of Fish-Breeding, 5th century BCE) contains references to keeping softshell turtles in fish ponds to control fish stocking density.

According to a study published in 2007, over a thousand turtle farms operated in China. A later report by the same team (Shi Haitao, James F. Parham, et al.), published in January 2008, was based on an attempt to survey all 1,499 turtle farms that were registered with the appropriate authorities of the People's Republic of China (namely, the Endangered Species Import and Export Management Office, and the Forestry Bureaus of individual provinces). The farms were mostly located in China's southern provinces of Guangdong, Guangxi, Hainan, and Hunan, although more recent sources indicate Zhejiang as particularly important. Some of the farms have been operating since the 1980s, the industry steadily growing since.

According to the responses obtained from 684 of those farms, they had a total of than 300 million animals, and sold over 128 million turtles each year, with the total weight of about 93,000 tons. Extrapolating from this sample, the researchers estimated that about 300 million farm-raised turtles are sold annually by China's registered turtle farms, worth (presumably, at the wholesale prices) around US$750 million. They note that a large number of unregistered farms also exist.

According to more recent Chinese statistics, annual production just of Chinese softshelled turtle amounted to 204,000 tons in 2008.

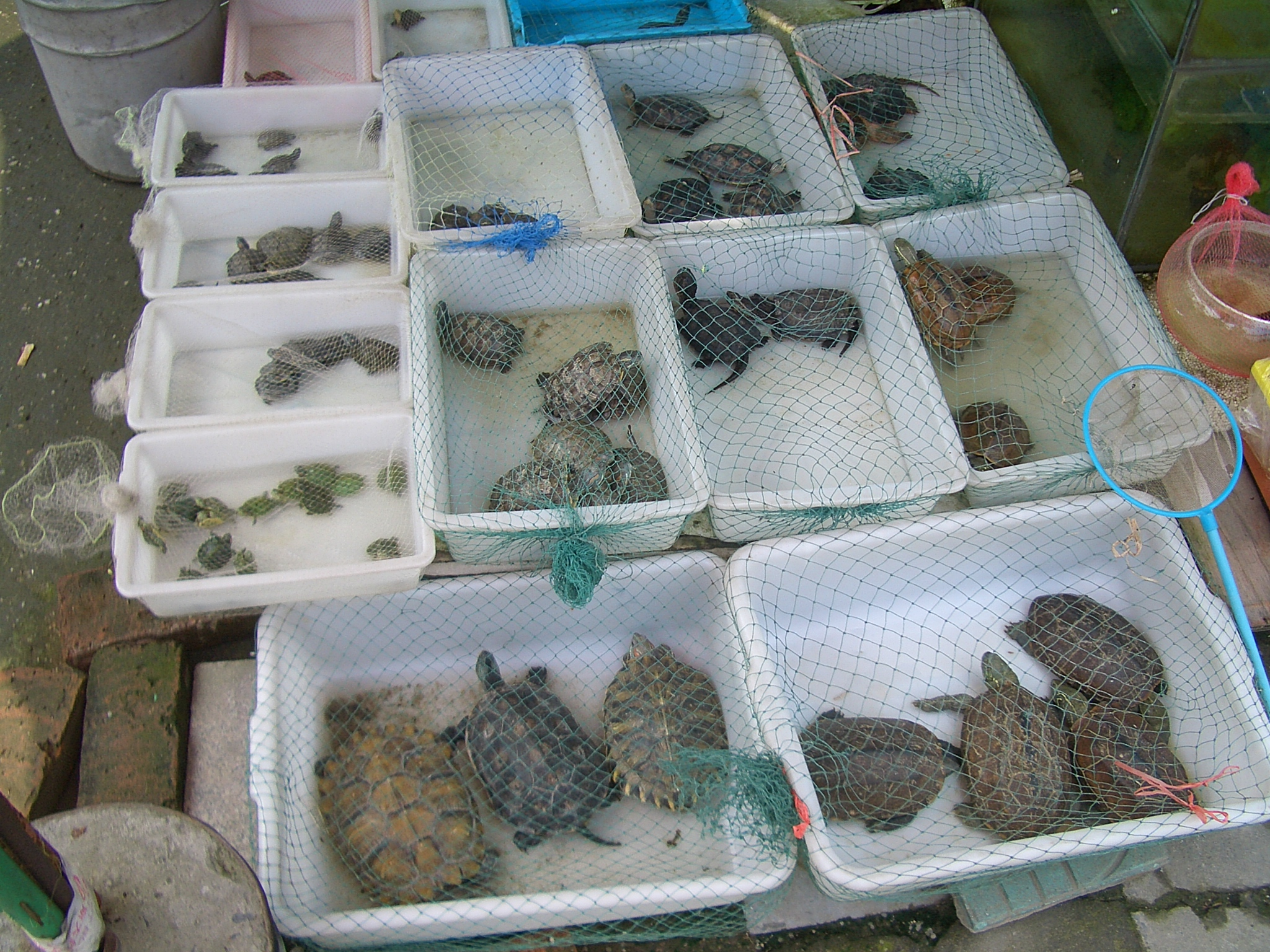
An assortment of turtles in a market in Yangzhou

The most common species raised by Chinese turtle farmers is the Chinese softshell turtle (Pelodiscus sinensis), accounting for over 97% of all reported sales, both in terms of head count (124.8 million in the 684-farm sample) and weight. Large-scale production of this species appears to have been successful in satisfying China gourmets' demand for its meat, which has been reflected in the price drop: while in the mid-1990s, wild-caught softshelled turtles retailed for CNY 500 per Chinese pound or jin (500 g), and farm-raised ones at over CNY 200 / Chinese pound, by 1999 the price for farm-raised softshelled turtles dropped to CNY 60 per Chinese pound, and by 2009, to merely CNY 15-16 per Chinese pound. Other species bred and raised in large numbers (in excess of 10,000 per year, each) in China are the wattle-necked softshell turtle (Palea steindachneri), Chinese pond turtle (Chinemys reevesii), yellow pond turtle (Mauremys mutica), Chinese stripe-necked turtle (Ocadia sinensis) and red-eared slider (Trachemys scripta elegans).

Numerous other species are farmed in smaller quantities. Among these is the rare golden coin turtle (Cuora trifasciata), fetching almost US$1,800 per turtle, as opposed to around $6.50 for a common Chinese softshell turtle, or $80 for a keeled box turtle (Cuora mouhotii) sold to pet trade, due to its rarity and purported medicinal value.

In a report from a Tunchang County, Hainan, turtle farm, published by James F. Parham and Shi Haitao in 2000, the researchers give a general idea of such an enterprise. According to the owner, the farm, established in 1983, had around 50,000 animals of over 50 different aquatic and terrestrial species. The majority, 30,000, were the common Chinese softshell turtle.

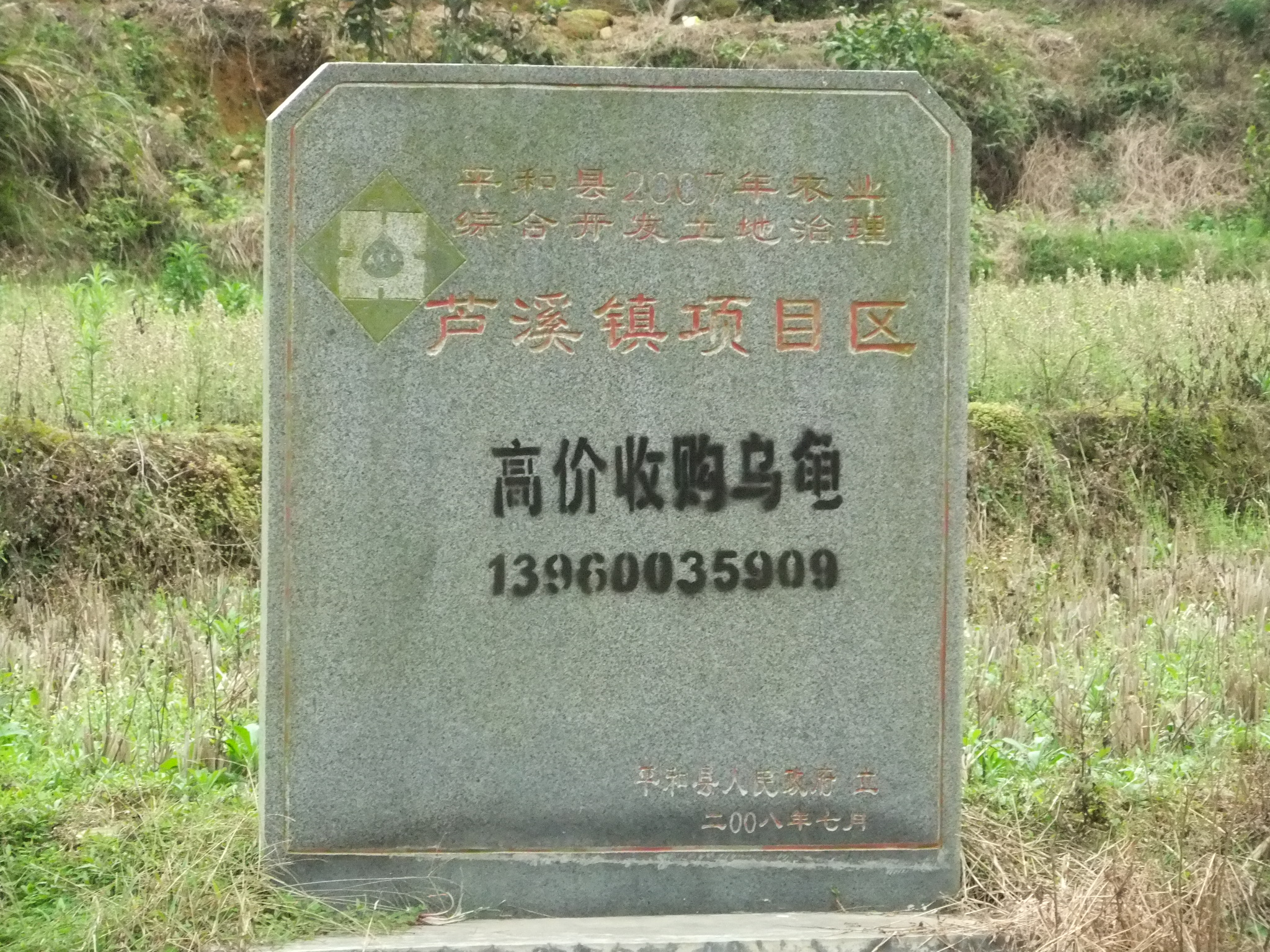
The practice of catching wild turtles continues, despite the availability of farmed ones. The stenciled advertisement, commonly seen in Luxi, Fujian, offers "high prices" for turtles

There were also 7,000 to 8,000 yellow pond turtles, and at least 1,000 of the prized golden coin turtle. The adult turtles lived in an 8 hectares (20 acres) outdoor breeding area, while the young ones were kept in indoor raising ponds.

Hybridization between various turtle species often occurs on the farms. This has often been unintentional, and was especially characteristic of the early days of the industry. Sometimes, however, hybridization is encouraged, e.g. to produce the hybrids of the valuable golden coin turtle and the more common yellow pond turtle. These hybrid turtles, known as the Fujian pond turtle (Mauremys iversoni), are sold to customers as pure-blood golden coin turtles.

=== Southeast Asia ===
Turtle and tortoise farming is thought to have prehistoric origins in Southeast Asia, as the elongated tortoise (Indotestudo elongata) was found in 2024 study to have been extended beyond its original range in the Indo-Burma region due to spread by early humans, who used them as a food source.

P. sinensis is fairly extensively farmed in Thailand, as well, with the (around the late 1990s) estimate of 6 million turtles hatching on Thai farms annually.

Turtle farming is undertaken in Vietnam, at least on a family farm scale. As early as 1993, researchers noted the existence of several hundred families near Hai Duong raising various amphibians and reptiles, including turtles. By 2004, companies with herds of several tens of thousand of softshelled turtles were in operation near Ha Tinh; the operators were said to have studied the turtle farming techniques in Thailand.

Van Hung Village, in Cat Thinh Commune (Văn Chấn District) has been described in the media as a village where family-run turtle farms, which started operating since 1999, have significantly raised the villagers' income and standard of living. The turtle species being farmed is described as Trionyx steindachneri, which is a synonym for Palea steindachneri or the wattle-necked softshell turtle.

=== United States ===
Turtle farming in the United States started in the early 1900s, with farms in Maryland and North Carolina raising diamondback terrapins, which are considered a delicacy in those parts. However, by the late 20th century, few turtles were raised for food in the United States, and American restaurants mostly relied on wild-caught turtles. Still, a turtle farm operated in Iowa as of 1999, and in 2012, red-ear sliders raised in Oklahoma were reported to be sold in Virginia and Maryland's Asian supermarkets.

Since the 1960s, a number of turtle farms have operated in several states, including Oklahoma and Louisiana. According to Louisiana agricultural scientists, Louisiana had around 60 turtle farms in 2007, producing some 10 million turtles a year. In 2004, 72 turtle farms were licensed by the State of Louisiana. The industry is said to have started "70-some years" ago (i.e., in the 1930s) with farmers collecting eggs laid by wild turtles, getting them to hatch, and selling the hatchlings as pets.

The US turtle industry suffered a serious setback in 1975 when the US Food and Drug Administration prohibited interstate trade in small turtles, specifically those with carapace lengths of less than 4 inches, to prevent spreading Salmonella infection. The FDA ban does allow for farmers to sell turtles within the US to be used for legitimate educational, scientific, or exhibitional purposes, and to sell turtles outside the US clearly marked as "Export Only".

To export any turtles, farmers are required to obtain an export permit by the United States Fish and Wildlife Service. Louisiana requires additional testing for farmer licensing: an anti-salmonellosis prophylactic treatment regimen developed at Louisiana State University by Ronald Siebeling and later enhanced by Mark Mitchell.

Because of the domestic ban and emphasis on exporting them internationally, the size of US turtle industry's volume can be surmised from recorded export data. The cumulative data includes both farmed and wild-caught turtles, but the farmed component is usually predominant. According to a study by the World Chelonian Trust, 97% of 31.8 million turtles and tortoises exported from the U.S. between November 2002 and November 2005 were farm-raised. Over this same period, 47% of the US turtle exports went to the People's Republic of China (predominantly to Hong Kong), another 20% to Taiwan, and 11% to Mexico.

Over one-half of all turtles exported from the United States over the study period were Trachemys scripta (17,524,786 individuals), primarily Trachemys scripta elegans, or red-eared sliders (15,181,688 individuals), as well as other Trachemys scripta subspecies).

In the 2010s, the US turtle farming industry reports dropping exports, perhaps due to the reduced demand for turtle hatchlings from Asian countries, whose own turtle farms are becoming more self-sufficient. According to one report, the US turtle production dropped from 13.4 million animals in 2004 to 4 million in 2013.

=== Cayman Islands ===
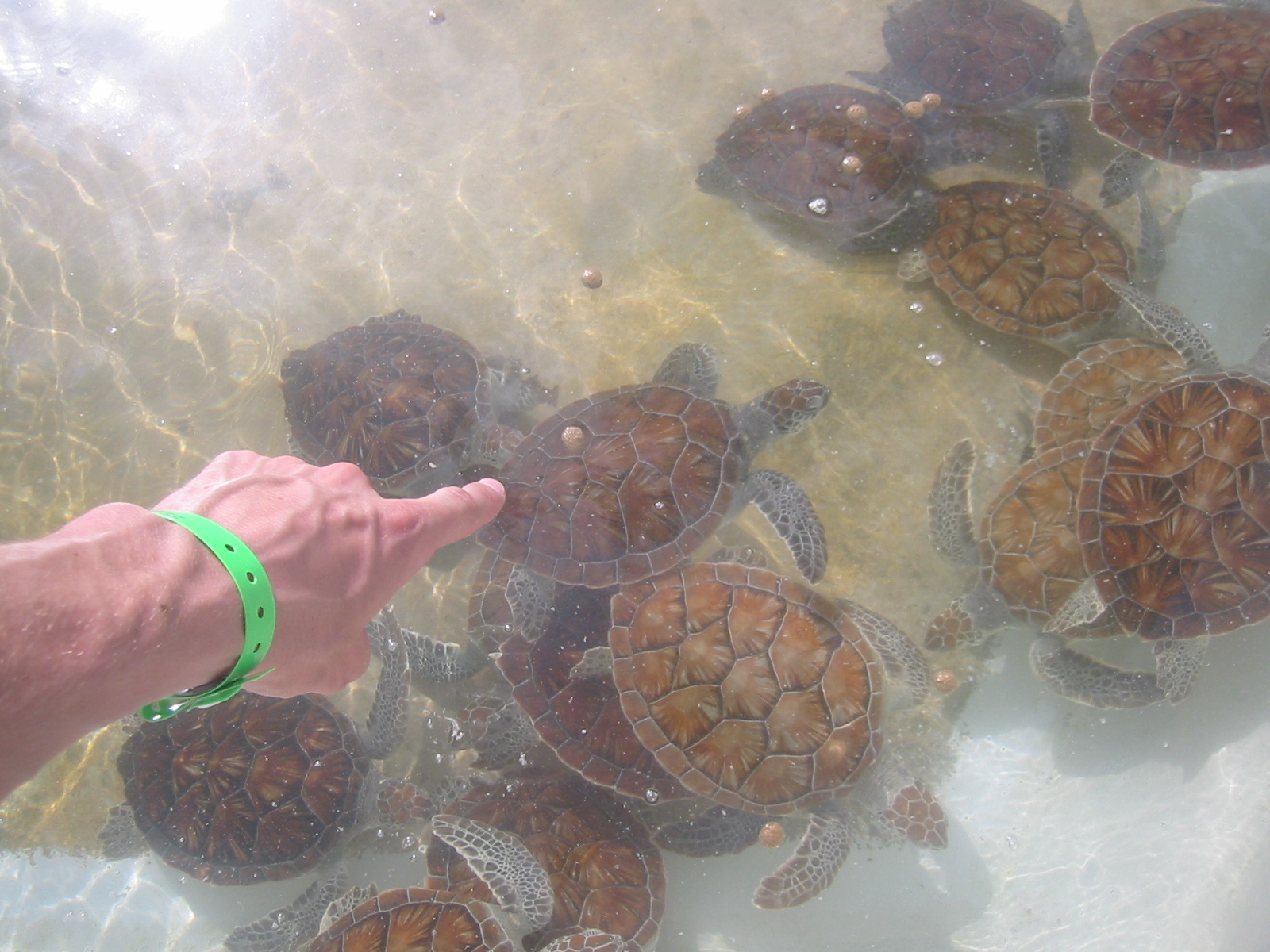
Young green sea turtles in a petting tank at the Cayman Turtle Farm

The Cayman Turtle Farm is a 23-acre marine park that operates in the West Bay district of Cayman Islands. They raise green sea turtles, primarily for their meat, a traditional food in Caymanian culture which was increasingly scarce in the wild. The farm, established in 1968, can produce more than 1800 turtles a year, but some of the farmed turtles are released. Between 1980 and 2006, the farm released some 30,600 turtles to the wild, and these individuals have subsequently been found throughout the Caribbean. Presently, the facility's "vision statement" is "to be the Cayman Islands' premier tourism attraction". A small number of hawksbill turtles have also been bred at the center.

Due to the lack of CITES certification, turtle products cannot be exported outside of the Cayman Islands and the United Kingdom. However, the farm claims on its website that "even the sale of turtle meat has a positive conservation impact because it greatly reduces poaching in the wild, which is often otherwise uncontrollable, both in terms of numbers and indiscriminate in terms of age and sex".

=== Europe ===
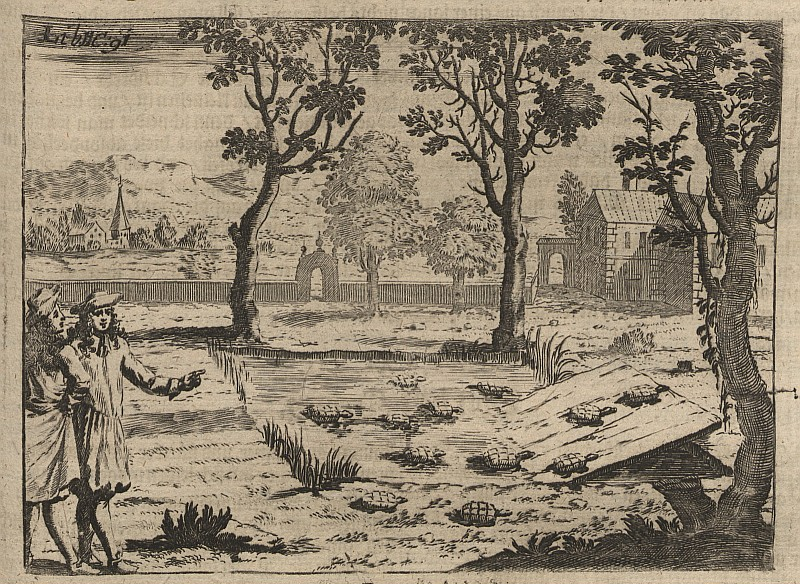
In his Georgica curiosa (1682), the Austrian Wolf Helmhardt von Hohberg described the design of a pond for raising turtles.

Turtle farms in Eastern Europe, in particular in North Macedonia, supply animals to pet shops in EU countries.

== Effect on wild populations ==
As the conservation expert Peter Paul van Dijk noted, the farmed turtles gradually replace wild-caught ones in the open markets of China, with the percentage of farm-raised individuals in the "visible" trade growing from around 30% in 2000 to around 70% around 2007. However, he and other experts caution that turtle farming creates extra pressure on the wild populations, as farmers commonly believe in the superiority of wild-caught breeding stock and place a premium on wild-caught breeders, which may create an incentive for turtle hunters to seek and catch the last remaining wild specimens of some species.

Even the potentially appealing concept of raising turtles at a farm to release into the wild (as done with some numbers of sea turtles at the Caymans establishment) is questioned by some veterinarians who have had some experience with farm operations. They caution that this may introduce into the wild populations infectious diseases that occur on the farm, but have not (yet) been occurring in the wild.

== See also ==
- Alligator farm
