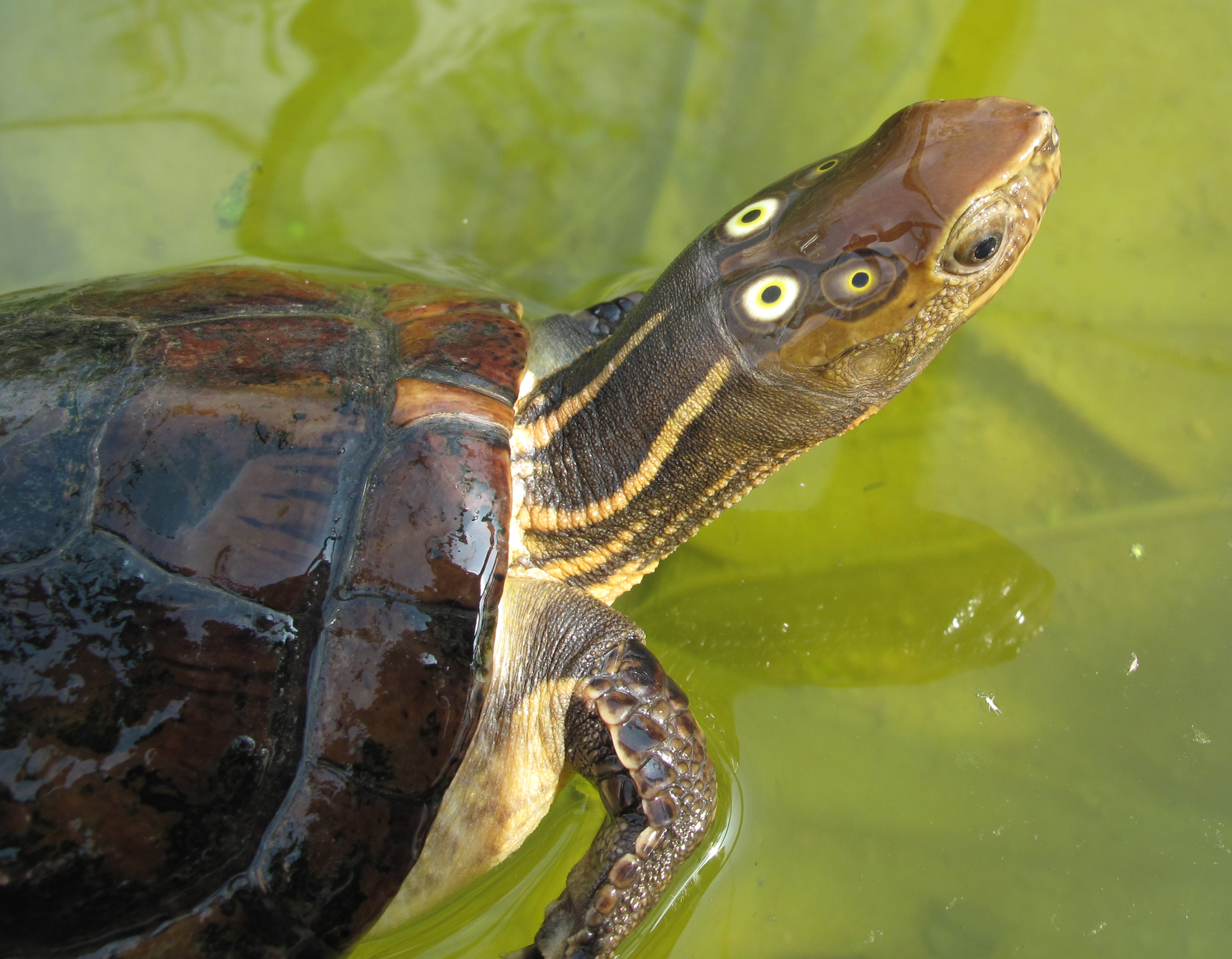
- Sacalia quadriocellata

Scientific classification
- Kingdom: Animalia
- Phylum: Chordata
- Class: Reptilia
- Order: Testudines
- Suborder: Cryptodira
- Family: Geoemydidae
- Subfamily: Geoemydinae
- Genus: Sacalia; Gray, 1870

= Sacalia =

Genus of turtles

Sacalia is a genus of turtles in the family Geoemydidae (formerly Bataguridae). The genus was erected by John Edward Gray in 1870. Sacalia species are native to Southeastern China, Laos, and Vietnam. Both members have been declared as endangered turtle species by the IUCN Red List due to illegal trade. Sacalia has a carapace of dark-brown color that permits it to camouflage to its habitat. They are believed to select the area of a river that better matches their color.

== Species ==
Two species are recognized.

- Sacalia bealei, Beale's eyed turtle or Beale's four-eyed turtle
- Sacalia quadriocellata, four-eyed turtle

== Hybridization ==
What was described as a new species, Sacalia pseudocellata, Chinese false-eyed turtle, is actually a hybrid of a male Cuora trifasciata and a female Sacalia quadriocellata.
