= Chinese broad-headed pond turtle =

Conservation status
- Endangered (IUCN 2.3)

Scientific classification
- Domain: Eukaryota
- Kingdom: Animalia
- Phylum: Chordata
- Class: Reptilia
- Order: Testudines
- Suborder: Cryptodira
- Superfamily: Testudinoidea
- Family: Geoemydidae
- Genus: Mauremys
- Species: M. megalocephala

Binomial name
- Mauremys megalocephala (Spinks et al., 2004)

Synonyms
- Chinemys megalocephala (Fang, 1934); Chinemys macrocephala (Bourret, 1941) (ex errore); Chinemys megacephala (Gurley, 2003) (ex errore)

Species of turtle

The Chinese broad-headed pond turtle (Mauremys megalocephala) is a species of turtle in the family Geoemydidae. It is endemic to China.

The species may be a synonym of the Reeve's turtle, having simply been described from Reeve's turtles with megacephaly, a condition associated with much larger and broader heads.
