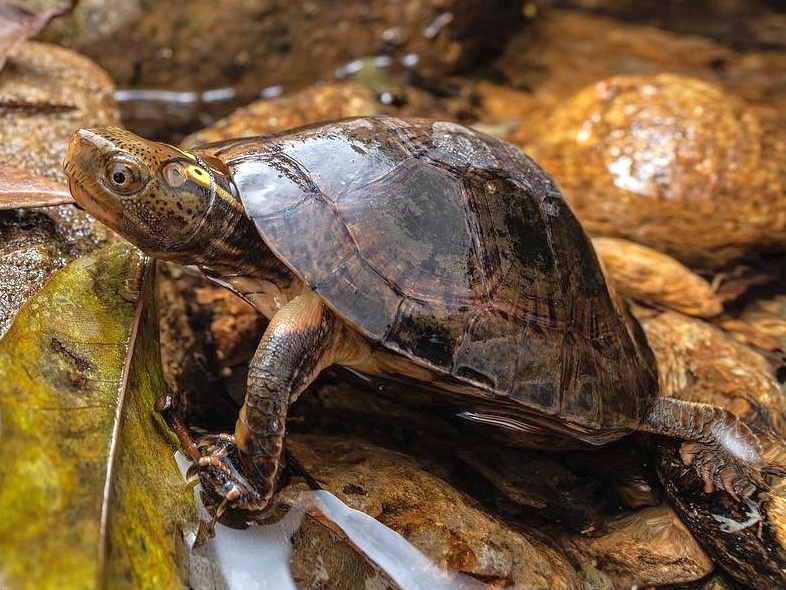

Conservation status
- Endangered (IUCN 3.1)
- CITES Appendix II

Scientific classification
- Kingdom: Animalia
- Phylum: Chordata
- Class: Reptilia
- Order: Testudines
- Suborder: Cryptodira
- Family: Geoemydidae
- Genus: Sacalia
- Species: S. bealei

Binomial name
- Sacalia bealei (Gray, 1831)

Synonyms
- Cistuda bealei Gray, 1831; Emys bealii [sic] Gray, 1834 (ex errore); Emys (Pyxidemys) bealei — Fitzinger, 1835; Clemmys bealii — Strauch, 1862; Sacalia bealii — Gray, 1870; Cistudo bealii — Siebenrock, 1909; Clemmys [bealii] bealii — Siebenrock, 1909; Chemmys [sic] beali T. Vogt, 1922 (ex errore); Clemmys bealei — Lindholm, 1929; Cistudo bealei — M.A. Smith, 1931; Sacalia bealei — McDowell, 1964; Mauremys bealei — Wermuth & Mertens, 1977; Sacalia beali — Ewert in Harless & Morlock, 1979; Sacalia bealei bealei — C. Ernst & R. Barbour, 1989; Clemmys beadei [sic] Yeh, 1994 (ex errore)

= Beale's eyed turtle =

Species of turtle

Beale's eyed turtle (Sacalia bealei) is a species of turtle in the family Geoemydidae (formerly Bataguridae). The species is endemic to China.

== Description ==
S. bealei has a yellowish-brown, smooth, rather depressed carapace spotted with black, and it has an olive-green head. Another form of this species has a brown carapace. In both forms, there are two pairs of black-centered ocelli on the back of the head which is peppered with black spots. This is a turtle of moderate size and will grow up to a maximum straight-line carapace length of 18 cm (7 inches).

== Habitat ==
A nocturnal species, S. bealei lives in mountain streams at all elevations, but with a preference for heavily forest-covered streams with many large stones so as to provide shelter.

== Diet ==
S. bealei feeds on crayfish and worms, and accepts meat in captivity.

== Behavior ==
A timid and nervous species, S. bealei will scramble and flail wildly with its claws when handled.

== Reproduction ==
S. bealei is reported to lay 6 eggs at a time. The nests are often half-buried by leaves and soil, and the entire nesting process may take up to 165 minutes.

== Common names ==
S. bealei is sometimes called Beale's four-eyed turtle, though that is not an ideal common name due to the possibility of confusion with the four-eyed turtle proper (S. quadriocellata).

== Etymology ==
The specific name, bealei, is in honor of Thomas Beale, a Scottish naturalist and merchant in China.

== Geographic range ==
S. bealei occurs throughout the provinces of central and Southern China. It is considered very rare in Hong Kong.

== Conservation status ==
Listed as endangered by the IUCN, these turtles are hunted for use in folk medicine. However, the Hong Kong Reptile and Amphibian Society has found that this species is sold in pet shops in Hong Kong, with the specimens almost certainly locally caught, even though the species is locally protected. It is also threatened by habitat loss. The fact that it lays only one clutch per year and that the eggs are often heavily infested with ants makes conservation efforts even harder for this already very rare species.
