= Fujian pond turtle =

Scientific classification
- Kingdom: Animalia
- Phylum: Chordata
- Class: Reptilia
- Order: Testudines
- Suborder: Cryptodira
- Family: Geoemydidae
- Genus: Mauremys
- Species: M. × iversoni

Binomial name
- Mauremys × iversoni Pritchard & McCord, 1991

Synonyms
- Mauremys iversoni Pritchard & McCord, 1991; Mauremys mutica × Cuora trifasciata Fritz & Havaš, 2007

Species of turtle

The Fujian pond turtle ("Mauremys" × iversoni) is a possibly also naturally occurring intergeneric hybrid turtle in the family Geoemydidae (formerly Bataguridae). The Fujian pond turtle is produced in larger numbers by Chinese turtle farms as a "copy" of the golden coin turtle Cuora trifasciata. It appears to occur in China and Vietnam. Before its actual origin became known, it was listed as data deficient in the IUCN Red List.

The parents of this hybrid are the Asian yellow pond turtle (Mauremys mutica) and the golden coin turtle, with the male apparently usually of the latter species. While it is not unusual for perfectly valid geoemydid species to arise from hybridization, recognition as a species would require that the hybrids are fertile and constitute a phenotypically distinct and self-sustaining lineage. This does not appear to be the case in this "species" as only single specimens have been found rather than an entire population of these turtles and captive breeding has rarely been successful as most males proved to be infertile (while females are fully fertile).

The Fujian pond turtle's scientific name was given in dedication to American herpetologist John B. Iverson.

"Clemmys guangxiensis" is a composite taxon described from specimens of Mauremys mutica and the natural hybrid "Mauremys" × iversoni.

== See also ==
- "Mauremys" × pritchardi
- "Ocadia" × glyphistoma
- Ocadia philippeni
- Cuora serrata
