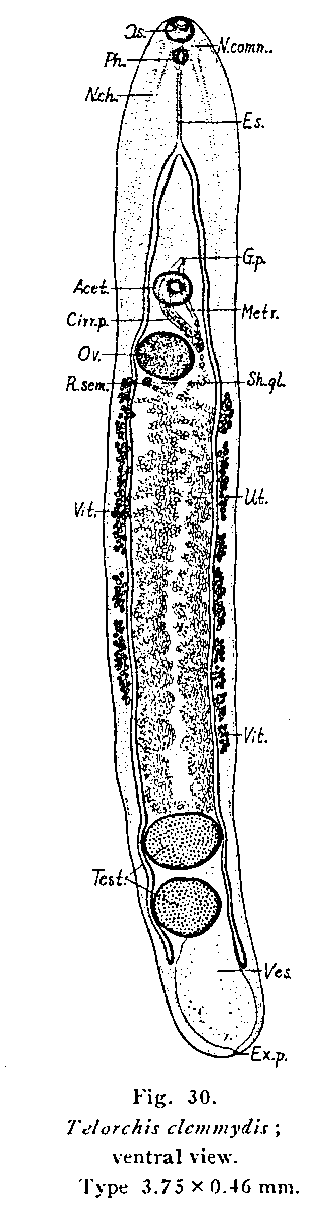
- Telorchis clemmydis

Scientific classification
- Kingdom: Animalia
- Phylum: Platyhelminthes
- Class: Trematoda
- Order: Plagiorchiida
- Suborder: Xiphidiata
- Superfamily: Plagiorchioidea
- Family: Telorchiidae; Looss, 1899

= Telorchiidae =

Family of flukes

Telorchiidae is a family of trematode parasites.

== Classification ==
Ten genera are described, classified in five subfamilies:

- Allotelorchiinae Goodman, 1988
  - Allotelorchis Goodman, 1988
  - Auritelorchis Stunkard, 1979
- Loefgreniinae Yamaguti, 1958
  - Loefgrenia Travassos, 1920
- Opisthioglyphinae Dollfus, 1949
  - Dolichosaccus Johnson, 1912
  - Opisthioglyphe Looss, 1899
- Orchidasmatinae Dollfus, 1937
  - Orchidasma Looss, 1900
- Telorchiinae Looss, 1899
  - Divitelluses Cai & Li, 1993
  - Oligolecithus Vercammen-Grandjean, 1960
  - Protenes Barker & Covey, 1911
  - Pseudotelorchis Yamaguti, 1971
  - Telorchis Lühe, 1899

In 2017, the World Register of Marine Species recognizes two genera: Orchidasma and Telorchis.
