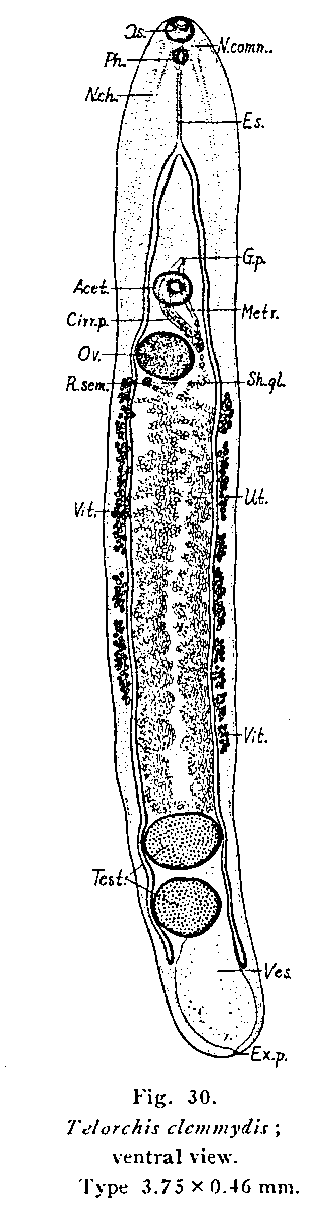
- Telorchis clemmydis

Scientific classification
- Kingdom: Animalia
- Phylum: Platyhelminthes
- Class: Trematoda
- Order: Plagiorchiida
- Family: Telorchiidae
- Genus: Telorchis; Lühe, 1899

Type species
- Telorchis clava (Diesing, 1850)

Synonyms
- Cercorchis; Paracercorchis; Protenes; Distomum (in part)

= Telorchis =

Genus of flukes

Telorchis is a genus of trematode parasites found in many herps, comprising around 70 species. This parasite is an indirect parasite, with a snail intermediate host and a reptile or amphibian definitive host. Typically found in the gastrointestinal tract of their definitive host, telorchids attach to the wall of the intestinal tract with their ventral sucker, or acetabulum.

== Morphology ==
Description of Telorchis from Wharton 1940: "Elongate, flat distomes with simple oral suckers. Oral and ventral suckers subequal. Pharynx present. Intestinal crura begin preacetabular and end near the posterior end of the body. Vitellaria lateral. Genital pore just anterior to the ventral sucker, usually somewhat to the left of the median line. Cirrus sac extends behind the acetabulum. Ovary posterior to or at the posterior level of cirrus sac. Uterus with descending and ascending coils, does not extend behind the testes. Metraterm anterior to ovary and usually about half as long as cirrus sac. Laurer's canal present. Testes in tandem at the posterior end."

== Species ==
- Telorchis achavali
- Telorchis aculeatus
- Telorchis anacondae
- Telorchis angustus
- Telorchis assula
- Telorchis attenuatus
- Telorchis auridistomi
- Telorchis bairdi
- Telorchis bifurcus
- Telorchis birabeni
- Telorchis bonnerensis
- Telorchis bravoae
- Telorchis caballeroi C.E.
- Telorchis caudatus
- Telorchis chelopi
- Telorchis clava
- Telorchis clemmydis
- Telorchis corti
- Telorchis cryptobranchi
- Telorchis cyclemidis
- Telorchis dhongokii
- Telorchis diaphanus
- Telorchis diminutus
- Telorchis dissentaneus
- Telorchis dissimilis
- Telorchis dollfusi
- Telorchis ercolani
- Telorchis erectus
- Telorchis gabesensis
- Telorchis geoclemmydis
- Telorchis gorukhpuri
- Telorchis grocotti
- Telorchis guptai
- Telorchis guttati
- Telorchis hagmanni
- Telorchis insculpti
- Telorchis kinosterni
- Telorchis konoi
- Telorchis linstowi
- Telorchis leptus
- Telorchis lobosus
- Telorchis medius
- Telorchis megacotyle
- Telorchis membranaceus
- Telorchis necturi
- Telorchis nematoides
- Telorchis pallidus
- Telorchis panamensis
- Telorchis parvus
- Telorchis patonianus
- Telorchis pellucidus
- Telorchis philippinensis
- Telorchis pleroticus
- Telorchis poirieri
- Telorchis pseudoaculeatus
- Telorchis rapidulus
- Telorchis reelfooti
- Telorchis robustus
- Telorchis ruszkowskii
- Telorchis scabrae
- Telorchis singularis
- Telorchis sirenis
- Telorchis solivagus
- Telorchis solivagus maroccanus
- Telorchis stenonura
- Telorchis stossichi
- Telorchis stunkardi
- Telorchis texanus
- Telorchis thamnophidis
