= Chinese false-eyed turtle =

Scientific classification
- Kingdom: Animalia
- Phylum: Chordata
- Class: Reptilia
- Order: Testudines
- Suborder: Cryptodira
- Family: Geoemydidae
- Subfamily: Geoemydinae
- Hybrid: Cuora trifasciata × Sacalia quadriocellata

Synonyms
- Sacalia pseudocellata Iverson & McCord, 1992; "Sacalia" × pseudocellata McCord & Iverson, 1992

Species of turtle

The Chinese false-eyed turtle (Cuora trifasciata × Sacalia quadriocellata) is a hybrid species of turtle in the family Geoemydidae. It is a hybrid between a male golden coin turtle (Cuora trifasciata) and a female four-eyed turtle (Sacalia quadriocellata). While formerly considered to be a wild species believed to be originally from Hainan, it is now known only from pet trade type specimens.
