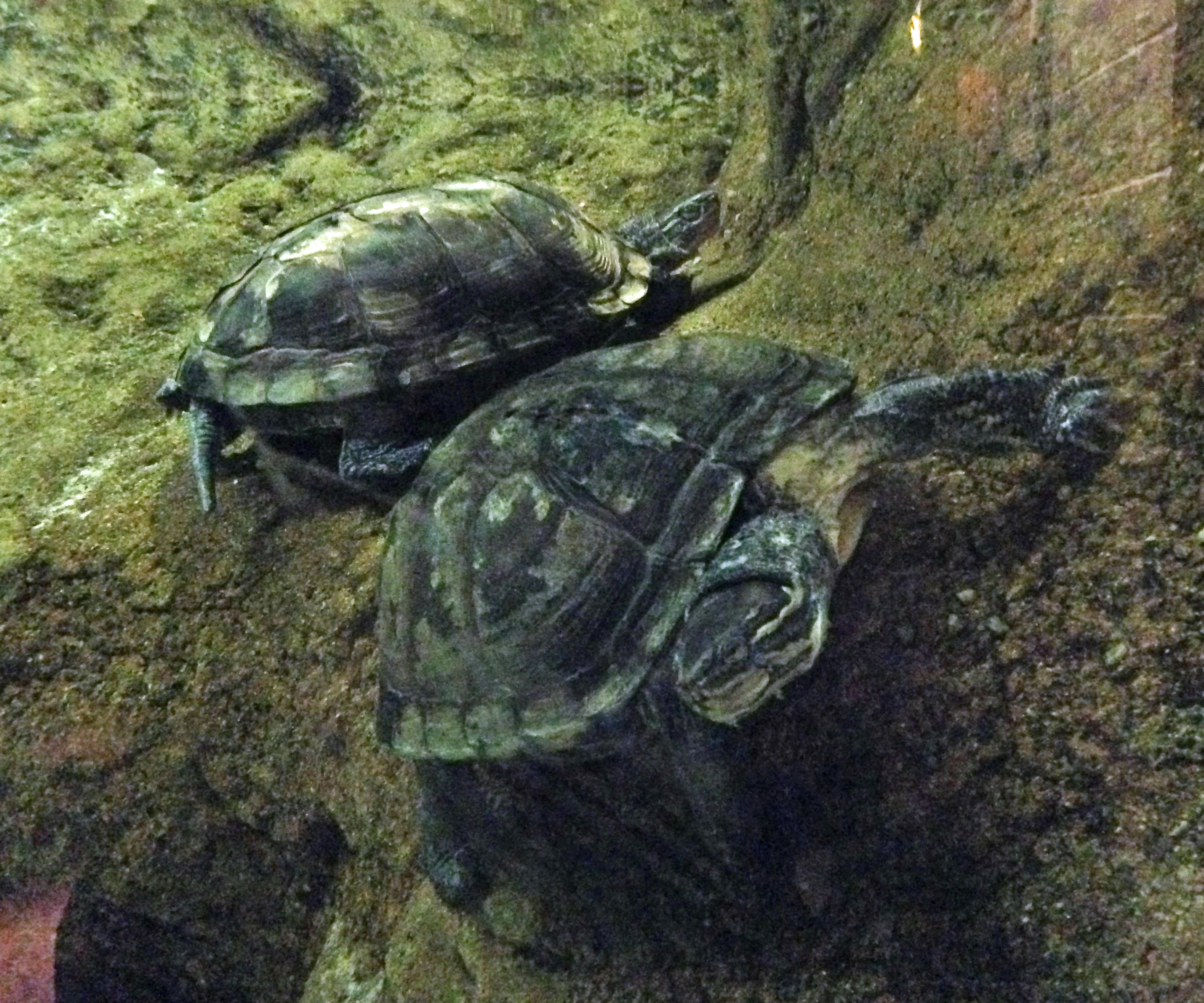

Conservation status
- Critically Endangered (IUCN 3.1)
- CITES Appendix I

Scientific classification
- Kingdom: Animalia
- Phylum: Chordata
- Class: Reptilia
- Order: Testudines
- Suborder: Cryptodira
- Family: Geoemydidae
- Genus: Mauremys
- Species: M. annamensis

Binomial name
- Mauremys annamensis (Siebenrock, 1903)
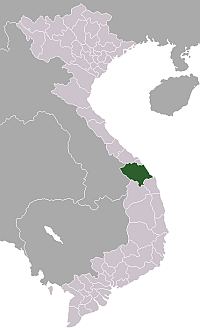

Synonyms
- Cyclemys annamensis Siebenrock, 1903; Cuora (Cyclemys) annamensis Bourret, 1927; Annamemys merkleni Bourret, 1939; Annamemys annamensis Savage, 1953; Annamemys mekleni Tien, 1957 (ex errore); Mauremys annamensis Iverson & McCord, 1994; Annamemys annamemys Highfield, 1996 (ex errore); Cathaiemys annamensis Vetter, 2006

= Vietnamese pond turtle =

Species of turtle

The Vietnamese pond turtle or Annam leaf turtle (Mauremys annamensis) is a species of turtle in the family Geoemydidae.

It can be distinguished from its relatives by its color pattern: the head is dark with three or four yellow stripes down the side. The plastron (belly shield) is firmly attached, yellow or orange, with a black blotch on each scute.

Endemic to a small area in central Vietnam, it was reportedly abundant in the 1930s, but all field surveys after 1941 had failed to locate any individuals in the wild. As it was occasionally seen traded as food, it was not yet extinct in the wild however.

In 2006, a wild population of M. annamensis was found near Hội An in Quảng Nam Province. Despite its rarity, specimens have been observed for sale in China and Hong Kong, and have been illicitly imported into the USA. A small number are being captive-bred on Hainan Island in southern China, as well as at the Cuc Phuong Turtle Conservation Center located in Cúc Phương National Park in northern Vietnam. The species is nonetheless close to extinction in the wild, as illegal hunting seems to continue. Reintroduction programmes of captive bred specimens are currently in progress.

Hybridization with other Geoemydidae genera is known to occur. The species has produced hybrids with the Malayan box turtle in captivity. In addition, the supposed new species Ocadia glyphistoma has turned out to be the offspring of a male Chinese stripe-necked turtle and a female of the present species; it might have been taken from the wild or also have been captive-bred. Captive Vietnamese pond turtles—which are occasionally available to experienced hobbyists, under the auspices of the IUCN-coordinated captive-breeding program—must therefore never be housed with related species. Hybridization in the wild would not seem to constitute a major threat, as the two parent species of "Ocadia" × glyphistoma are not closely related, and the hybrids are thus likely to be sterile. However, with a species as rare as the Vietnamese pond turtle, more research into this issue is certainly necessary.
