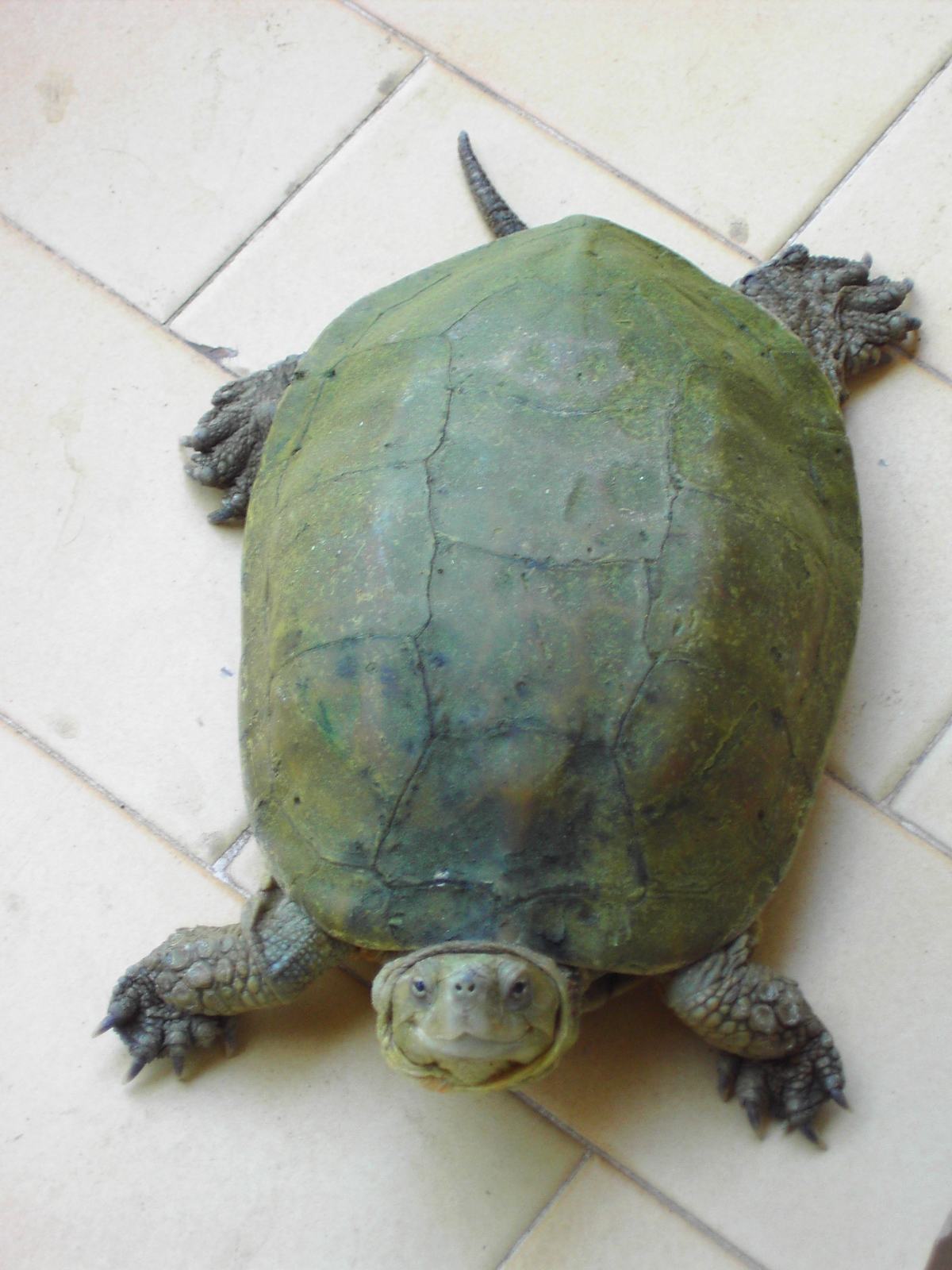
- Mauremys leprosa, adult female from Spain

Scientific classification
- Kingdom: Animalia
- Phylum: Chordata
- Class: Reptilia
- Order: Testudines
- Suborder: Cryptodira
- Family: Geoemydidae
- Subfamily: Geoemydinae
- Genus: Mauremys; Gray, 1869

Synonyms
- Ocadia Gray 1870:35; Emmenia Gray 1870:38; Eryma Gray 1870:44 (junior homonym); Cathaiemys Lindholm 1931:29; Pseudocadia Lindholm 1931:30; Chinemys Smith 1931:xxvii Annamemys Bourret 1939b:15

= Mauremys =

Genus of turtles

Mauremys is a genus of turtles in the family Geoemydidae (formerly called Bataguridae).

Species include:

- Japanese pond turtle, M. japonica
- Yellow pond turtle, M. mutica
  - M. mutica mutica
  - M. mutica kami
- Vietnamese pond turtle or Annam leaf turtle, M. annamensis - formerly separated in Annamemys
- Caspian turtle or striped-neck terrapin, M. caspica
  - M. caspica caspica
  - M. caspica siebenrocki
  - M. caspica vetrimaculata
- Balkan pond turtle or Balkan terrapin, M. rivulata - formerly included in M. caspica
- Spanish pond turtle, M. leprosa - formerly included in M. caspica
  - M. leprosa leprosa
  - M. leprosa saharica
- Chinese broad-headed pond turtle, M. megalocephala
- Red-necked pond turtle, M. nigricans
- Chinese pond turtle, M. reevesii
- Chinese stripe-necked turtle, M. sinensis

The Fujian pond turtle, described as Mauremys iversoni, is a farm-bred hybrid, between yellow pond turtles (usually females) and the golden coin turtle or Cuora cyclornata (usually males). Similarly, the turtles described as Mauremys pritchardi are farm-bred and wild-occurring hybrids between the Chinese pond turtle and the yellow pond turtle. While it is not unusual for valid species of geoemydid turtles to arise from hybrids, this is yet to be discussed with M. pritchardi; M. iversoni is probably not, since they only seem to be produced in farms and most males are sterile.
