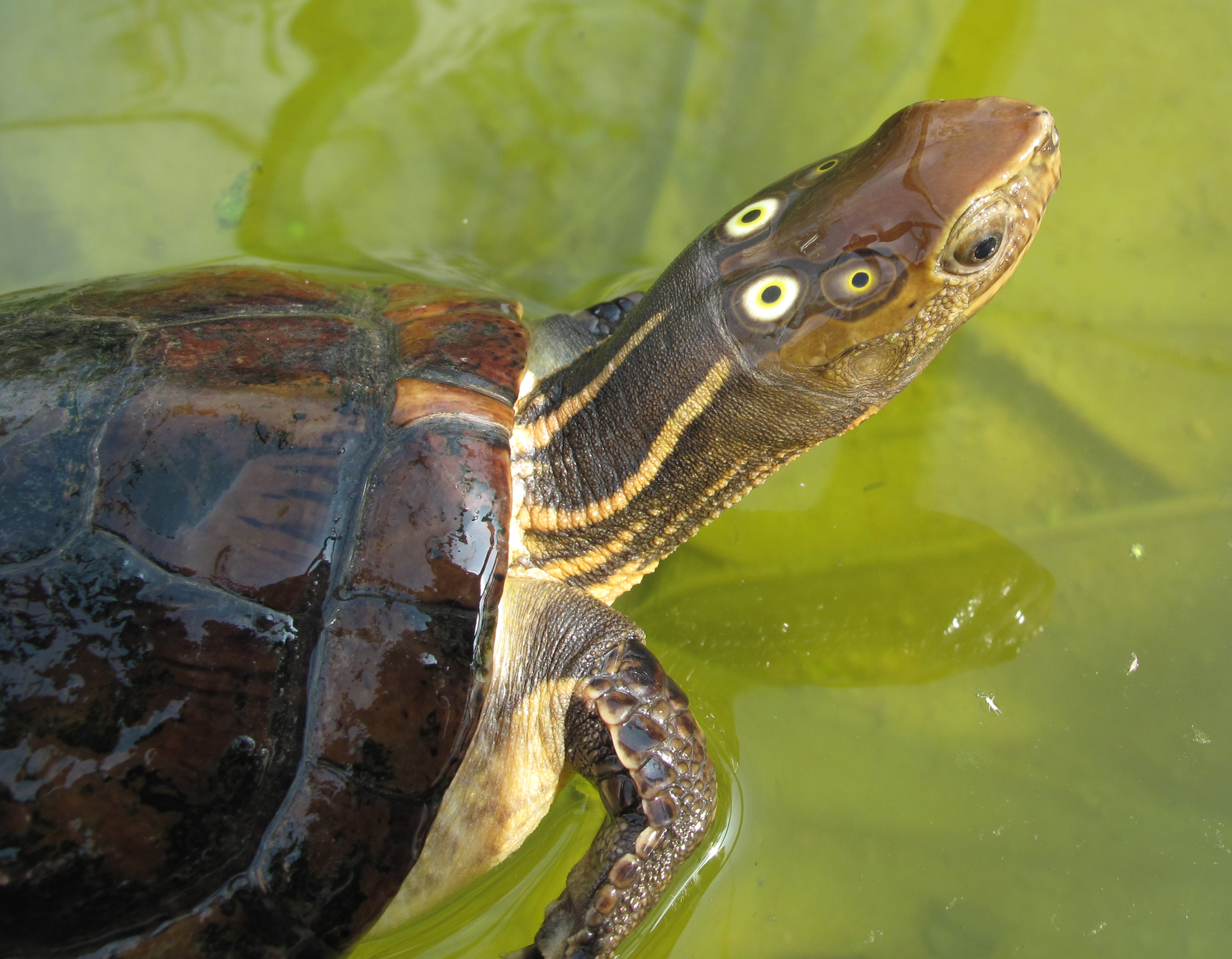

Conservation status
- Critically Endangered (IUCN 3.1)
- CITES Appendix II

Scientific classification
- Kingdom: Animalia
- Phylum: Chordata
- Class: Reptilia
- Order: Testudines
- Suborder: Cryptodira
- Family: Geoemydidae
- Genus: Sacalia
- Species: S. quadriocellata

Binomial name
- Sacalia quadriocellata Siebenrock, 1903

Synonyms
- Clemmys bealii var. quadriocellata Siebenrock, 1903; Clemmys quadriocellata — Pope, 1934; Clemmys bealei quadriocellata — Bourret, 1941; Clemmys beali insulensis Adler, 1962; Sacalia quadriocellata — Pritchard, 1979; Sacalia bealei quadriocellata — C. Ernst & R. Barbour, 1989; Sacalia quadriocellata quadriocellata — Artner, 2003; Sacalia quadriocellata insularis [sic] Artner, 2003 (ex errore)

= Four-eyed turtle =

Species of turtle

The four-eyed turtle (Sacalia quadriocellata) is a reptile of the order Testudines. Its name refers to two bright yellow or green spots that occur on the back of its head that can look like another pair of eyes.

== Geographic range ==
This species of turtle occurs in southern China and Hainan, in the Annamite Mountains and northeastern region of Laos, and in the mountains of northern and central Vietnam.

== Hybridization ==
A male of this species has successfully produced hybrids with the Golden coin turtle in captivity. Given that the "four-eye" pattern is inherited by these hybrids, it seems well possible that the mysterious Chinese false-eyed turtle (Sacalia pseudocellata) is actually based on a hybrid specimen.

== Description ==
The four-eyed turtle can grow to a carapace length of 15 cm (5.9 in). Its carapace typically ranges in color from a yellowish-tan to a deep chocolate-brown, and all turtles have a distinct pattern of lines. The turtle's head is often colorful with yellow or green eyes, yellow stripes, and a pink or red throat. Two (sometimes four) eye-like ocelli occur on the back of the head, hence the turtle's name.

== Ecology ==
Four-eyed turtles occur in freshwater streams, brooks, and ponds in woodland, often mountainous habitats. As a result of their rugged surroundings, they have adapted to become adept climbers.

While their dietary preferences have not been studied in detail, it is known that they do eat a wide variety of animals and plants including crickets, worms, snails, trout chow, aquatic plants, greens and lettuces, and certain fruits.

== Status and conservation ==
The species is listed as Critically Endangered by the IUCN. It is also listed in Appendix II of the Convention on International Trade in Endangered Species (CITES) meaning international trade (including in parts and derivatives) is regulated.

A main factor in the decline of the four-eyed turtle is trade and demand for their shells. Therefore, species recovery programs are needed to ensure the future of the species. There is currently an extensive communication between zoo and conservation personnel in Vietnam whose goal is to coordinate recovery programs. The recovery programs will include legal protection for the turtles which will affect turtle trading.

Large quantities of turtle shell are used as an ingredient in Traditional Chinese Medicine (TCM). For instance, Taiwan confirmed that 940 tons of hard shelled turtle bone and 200 tons of soft shell turtle bones were imported between 1992 and 1998. The plastron - the belly shell - is used in TCM prescriptions. Some TCM scientists argue that there is no difference between plastron and carapace (back shell) bone. So, if both plastron and carapace bone are utilized, the demand of TCM for freshwater turtles, including four-eyed turtles, could decrease by 50% or even more, since the carapace is larger than the plastron. Current TCM research also suggests that there is no pharmaceutical difference in the effects of bone from animals produced on farms and animals captured in nature. As a result, farm production of turtle bone for TCM is likely to increase. In addition, TCM research could help find alternatives to turtle bone such as herbs.

=== Conservation efforts ===
The Asian Turtle Program has helped publicize turtle conservation all throughout Asia. The ATP, a branch of Indo-Myanmar Conservation, has a regularly updated website with up-to-date news that helps spotlight the status of endangered turtles throughout Asia.
