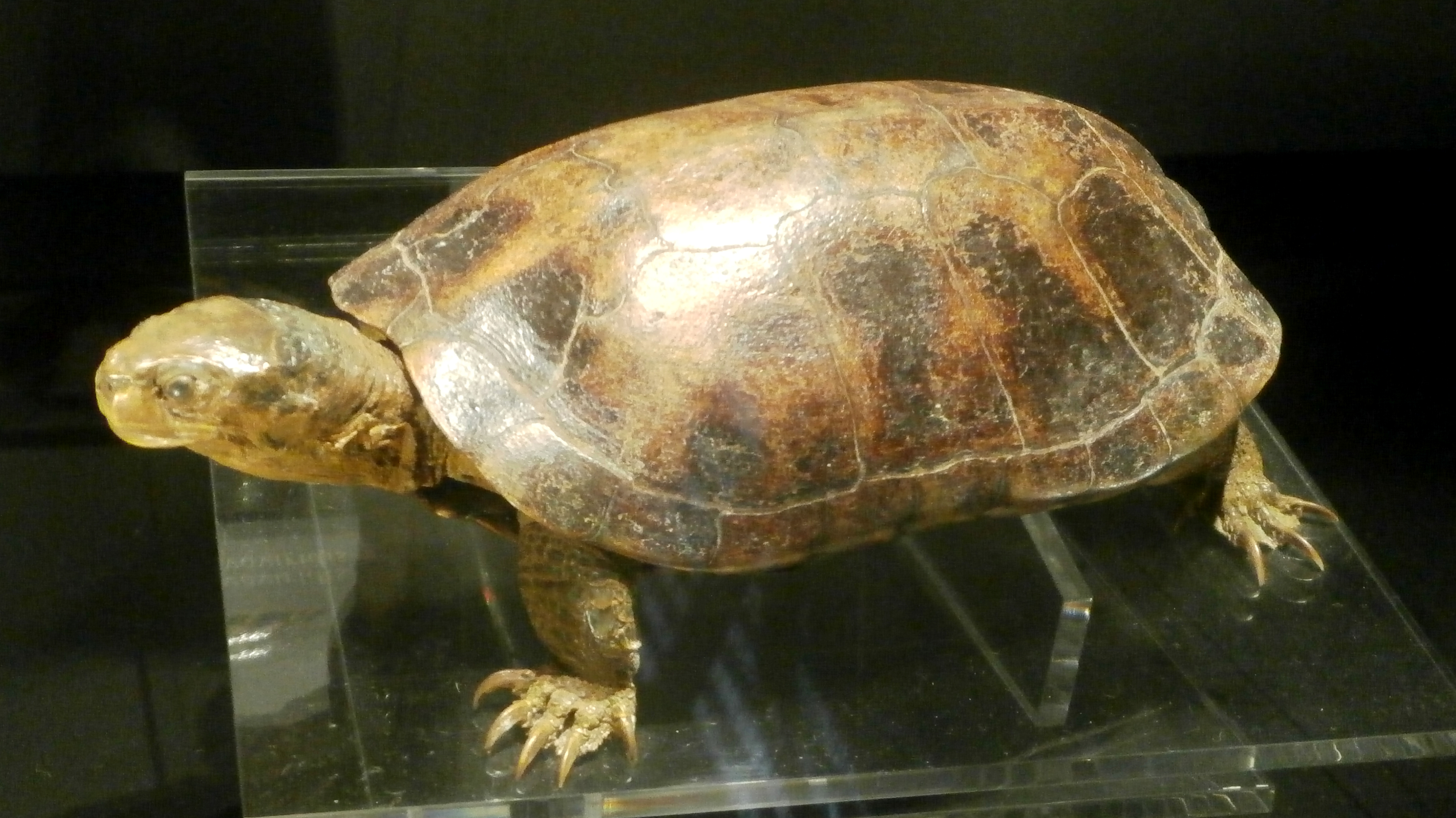
- Taxidermed specimen of Mauremys mutica kami, exhibited in the National Museum of Nature and Science, Tokyo, Japan

Conservation status
- Critically Endangered (IUCN 3.1)
- CITES Appendix II

Scientific classification
- Kingdom: Animalia
- Phylum: Chordata
- Class: Reptilia
- Order: Testudines
- Suborder: Cryptodira
- Family: Geoemydidae
- Genus: Mauremys
- Species: M. mutica

Binomial name
- Mauremys mutica (Cantor, 1842)

Synonyms
- Mauremys mutica mutica: Emys muticus Cantor, 1842; Emys mutica Gray, 1844; Clemmys mutica Boettger, 1888; Damonia mutica Boulenger, 1889; Clemmys schmackeri Boettger, 1894; Geoclemys mutica Siebenrock, 1909; Cathaiemys mutica Lindholm, 1931; Annamemys grochovskiae Tien, 1957; Annamemys groeliovskiae Battersby, 1960 (ex errore); Mauremys mutica McDowell, 1964; Mauremys muica Zhou & Zhou, 1991 (ex errore); Mauremys grochovskiae Iverson & McCord, 1994; Mauremys mutica mutica Yasukawa, Ota & Iverson, 1996; Cathaiemys mutica mutica Vetter, 2006; Mauremys mutica kami: Mauremys mutica kami Yasukawa, Ota & Iverson, 1996; Mauremys mutica karni Ferri, 2002 (ex errore); Cathaiemys mutica kami Vetter, 2006

= Yellow pond turtle =

Species of turtle

The yellow pond turtle (Mauremys mutica), is a medium-sized (to 19.5 cm), semiaquatic turtle in the family Geoemydidae. This species has a characteristic broad yellow stripe extending behind the eye and down the neck; the carapace ranges in color from grayish brown to brown, and the plastron is yellow or orange with black blotches along the outer edges. It is native to East Asia, ranging from central Vietnam and Laos, north through the coastal provinces of south and central China, with insular populations known from Taiwan, Hainan and the Ryukyu Islands. Although populations in the southern Ryukyus are thought to be native, populations in the northern and central Ryukyus, as well as central Japan, are believed to have been introduced as a result of imports from Taiwan.

== Habitat ==
This species inhabits ponds, creeks, swamps, marshes, and other bodies of shallow, slow-moving water. It is omnivorous, feeding on insects, fish, tadpoles, and vegetable matter such as leaves and seeds. The yellow pond turtle generally remains in or close to water during the day, but may become more active at night and during rainy weather, when it sometimes ventures onto land.

== Hybridization ==
One subspecies, M. m. kami, is currently recognized in the southern Ryukyu Islands. Research has shown unexpected genetic diversity in M. mutica, raising the possibility that additional subspecies might exist. Evidence of widespread hybridization further complicates efforts to understand the genetics of this and related species. Several hybrid Asian pond turtles that were described as new species have been found to be hybrids. Fujian pond turtles (Mauremys iversoni) are hybrid specimens mainly produced in Chinese turtle farms, usually from matings between female yellow pond turtles and golden coin turtles (Cuora trifasciata) males. The supposed Mauremys pritchardi turtles are wild and captive-bred hybrids between the present species and the Chinese pond turtle (Chinemys reevesi).

"Clemmys guangxiensis" is a composite taxon described from specimens of M. mutica and the natural hybrid "Mauremys" × iversoni.

== Conservation ==
The yellow pond turtle is threatened with extinction. China is the largest consumer of turtles in the world, and this trade has been cited as the greatest threat to Asian turtles, including M. mutica. Most of the turtle trade is destined for human consumption, but traditional medicine and the pet trade are also driving demand for turtles. Habitat loss and water pollution are additional impacts. The IUCN considers M. mutica a critically endangered species and it is listed in CITES Appendix II.

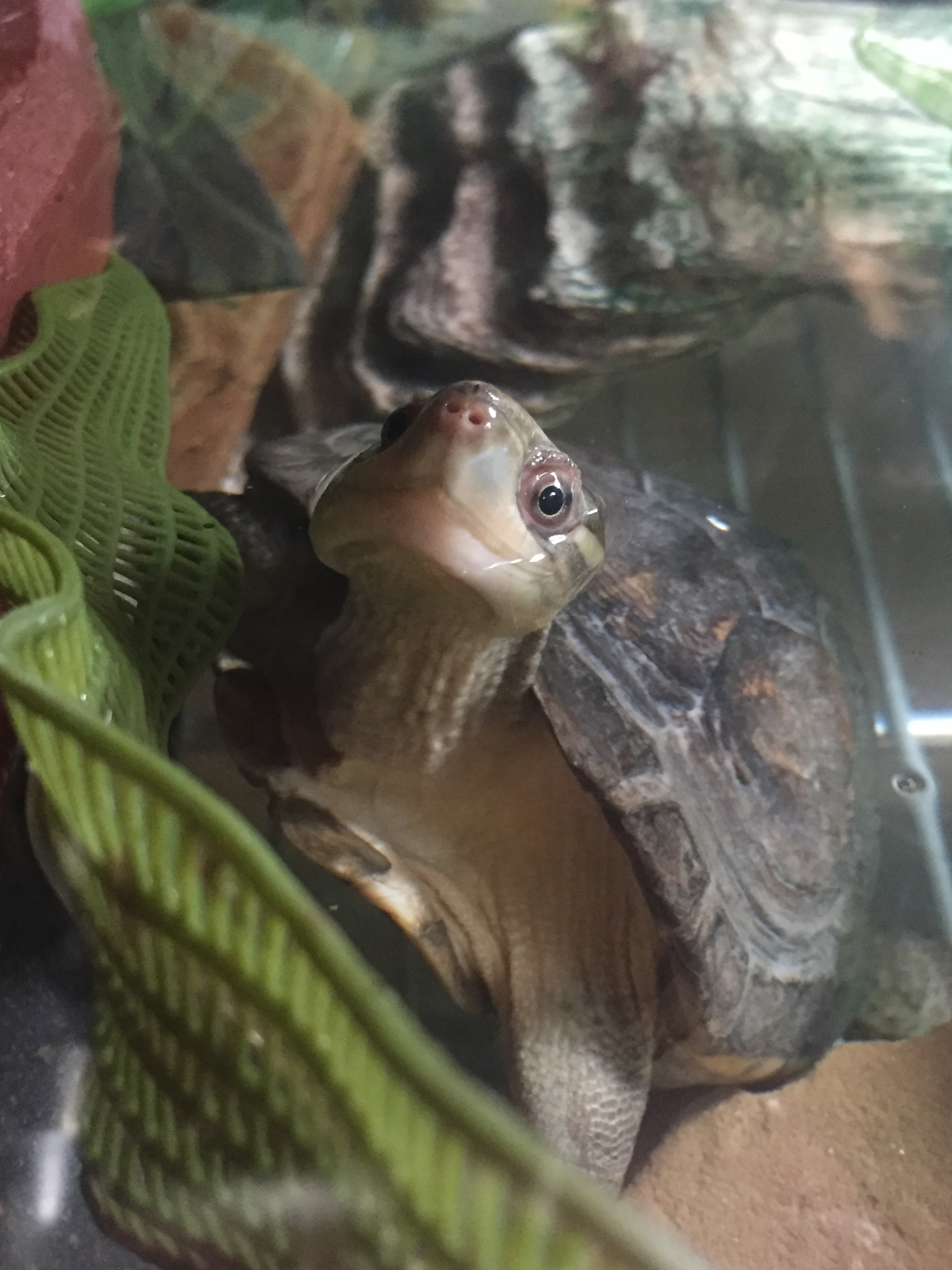
A yellow pond turtle, Mauremys mutica, at the surface of the water in a terrarium

== Relationship with humans ==
M. mutica was historically used in plastromancy for oracle bone divination during the Shang dynasty of China, circa 1600 to 1046 B.C.
