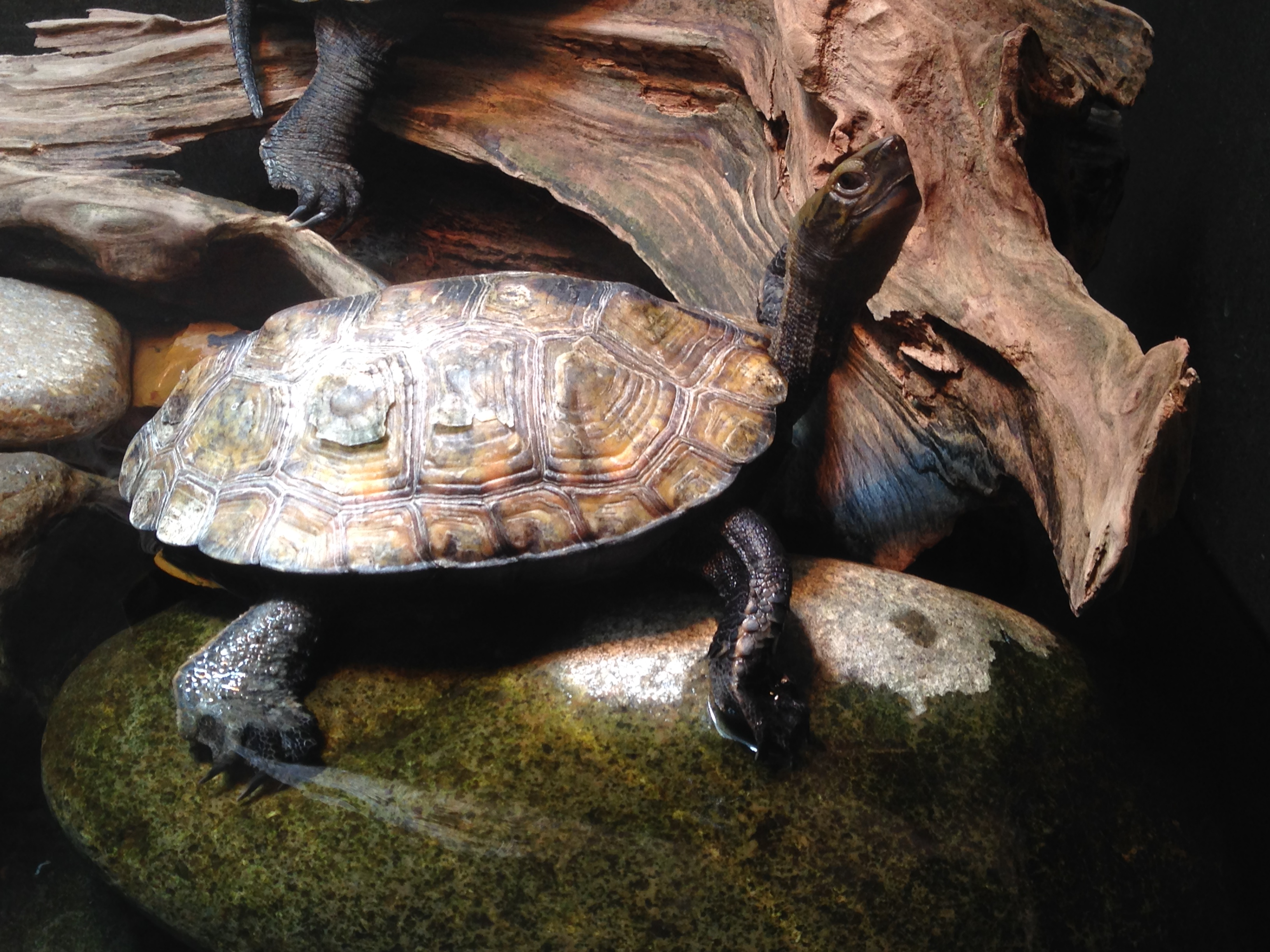
- Japanese pond turtle (Mauremys japonica)

Conservation status
- Near Threatened (IUCN 3.1)
- CITES Appendix II

Scientific classification
- Kingdom: Animalia
- Phylum: Chordata
- Class: Reptilia
- Order: Testudines
- Suborder: Cryptodira
- Family: Geoemydidae
- Genus: Mauremys
- Species: M. japonica

Binomial name
- Mauremys japonica (Temminck & Schlegel in Siebold, 1835)

Synonyms
- Emys vulgaris japonica Temminck & Schlegel, 1835; Emys japonica Gray, 1844; Emys caspica var. japonica Duméril & Bibron, 1852; Clemmys japonica Strauch, 1862; Mauremys japonica McDowell, 1964; Ocadia japonica Vetter, 2006

= Japanese pond turtle =

Species of turtle

The Japanese pond turtle (Mauremys japonica), also called commonly the Japanese pond terrapin and the Japanese pond tortoise, is a species of turtle in the family Geoemydidae endemic to Japan. Its Japanese name is nihon ishigame, Japanese stone turtle. Its population has decreased somewhat due to habitat loss, but it is not yet considered a threatened species.

This species is known to hybridize with the Chinese pond turtle, the Chinese stripe-necked turtle, and the Chinese box turtle (and possibly other Geoemydidae) in captivity. As these three species are much rarer and strongly declining in the wild, this should be avoided.

The Japanese pond turtle is an aquatic species found in many freshwater bodies of water. These include rivers, lakes, ponds, swamps, marshes, and irrigated rice paddies in the flatlands surrounding highlands. Although they can be found on both flatlands and on the slopes of the mountains, studies have shown they are more likely to thrive on the flatlands. This can be essential to understanding the conservation measures needed to protect this near-threatened species.
