= Philippen's striped turtle =

Scientific classification
- Domain: Eukaryota
- Kingdom: Animalia
- Phylum: Chordata
- Class: Reptilia
- Order: Testudines
- Suborder: Cryptodira
- Superfamily: Testudinoidea
- Family: Geoemydidae
- Subfamily: Geoemydinae
- Genus: Mauremys
- Hybrid: Mauremys sinensis♂ × Cuora trifasciata♀

Synonyms
- "Mauremys" philippeni McCord & Iverson, 1992; Ocadia philippeni McCord & Iverson, 1992

Turtle hybrid

Philippen's striped turtle, "Mauremys" philippeni, has recently shown to be an intergeneric hybrid (Stuart & Parham, 2006) between a male Mauremys sinensis and a female Cuora trifasciata.

The "species" is known only from a handful of specimens (mainly the type series), said to originate from Hainan, but all acquired from a pet trader in Hong Kong.

== Etymology ==
The specific name, phillipeni, is in honor of German herpetologist Hans-Dieter Phillipen (born 1957).
