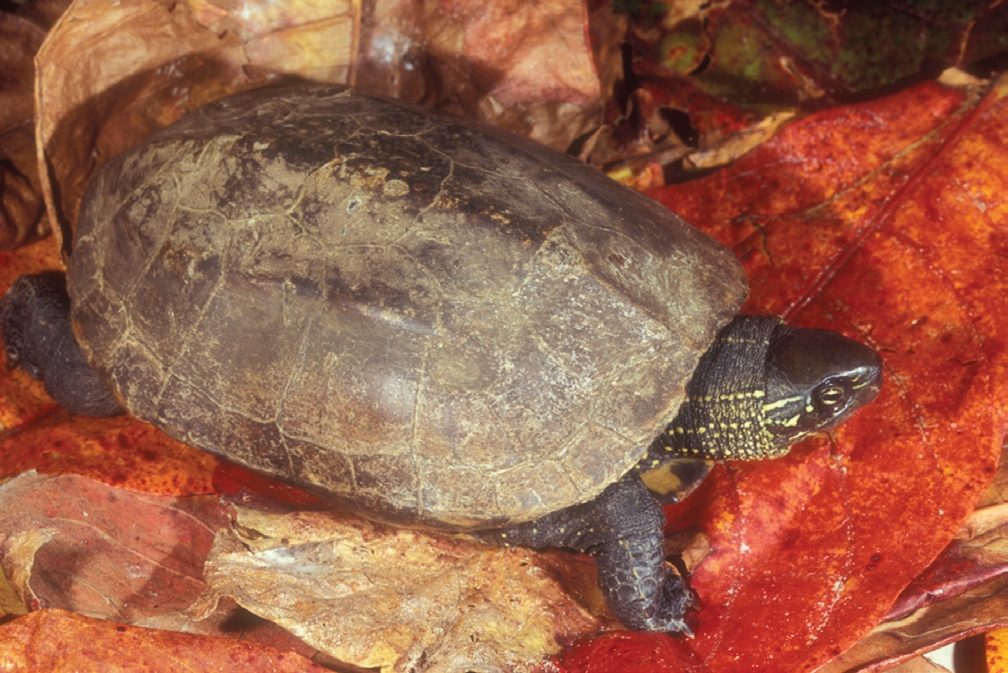
- Non-native M. reevesii in East Timor
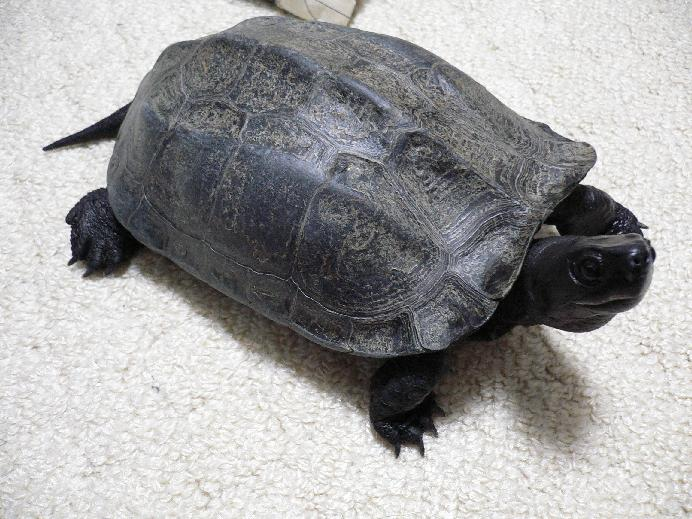
- Melanistic male

Conservation status
- Endangered (IUCN 3.1)

Scientific classification
- Kingdom: Animalia
- Phylum: Chordata
- Class: Reptilia
- Order: Testudines
- Suborder: Cryptodira
- Family: Geoemydidae
- Genus: Mauremys
- Species: M. reevesii

Binomial name
- Mauremys reevesii (Gray, 1831)

Synonyms
- click to expand: * Emys reevesii Gray, 1831; * Clemmys (Clemmys) reevesii — Fitzinger, 1835; * Emys vulgaris picta Schlegel, 1844; * Emys japonica A.M.C. Duméril & Bibron in A.M.C. Duméril & A.H.A. Duméril, 1851; * Geoclemys reevesii — Gray, 1856; * Damonia reevesii — Gray, 1869; * Damonia unicolor Gray, 1873; * Clemmys unicolor — Sclater, 1873; * Damonia reevesii var. unicolor — Boulenger, 1889; * Geoclemys [reevesii] reevesii — Siebenrock, 1907; * Geoclemys reevesii unicolor — Siebenrock, 1907; * Geoclemmys [sic] reevesi — Vogt, 1924 (ex errore); * Geoclemys grangeri Schmidt, 1925; * Geoclemys paracaretta Chang, 1929; * Geoclemys reevesi grangeri — Mell, 1929; * Chinemys reevesi — H.M. Smith, 1931; * Geoclemys papacaretta [sic] Fang, 1934 (ex errore); * Emys reevesi — Bourret, 1941; * Chinemys reevesii Mertens & Wermuth, 1955; * Chinemys reevesi — Mao, 1971; * Chinemys grangeri — Pritchard, 1979; * Chinemys pani Tao, 1988; * Chinemys reevessi [sic] Obst, 1996 (ex errore); * Chinemys reveesii [sic] Fritz, 1996 (ex errore); * Mauremys reevesii — Spinks, Shaffer, Iverson & McCord, 2004

= Chinese pond turtle =

Species of turtle

Mauremys reevesii, commonly known as the Chinese pond turtle, the Chinese three-keeled pond turtle, or Reeves' turtle, is a species of turtle in the family Geoemydidae, a family which was formerly called Bataguridae. The species is native to East Asia.

Alongside the Chinese softshell turtle, it is one of the two most commonly found species used for divination that have been recovered from Shang dynasty sites.

== Description ==
While the species typically appears to have a brown shell, dark grey skin, with yellow markings on the neck and yellow irises, melanism is well documented in males, where the entirety of the animal including the eyes becomes completely black and the yellow markings are lost. Melanism only occurs in mature males over 7 years old. Old females may sometimes also develop darker shells and fewer markings.

Certain populations of Reeve's turtles may exhibit megacephaly. Megacephalic turtles have much larger and broader heads, and hypertrophied jaws muscles. In at least one other species of turtle, it appears that megacephaly may not be genetically linked, instead developing in individuals as a response to a heavily durophagous diet.

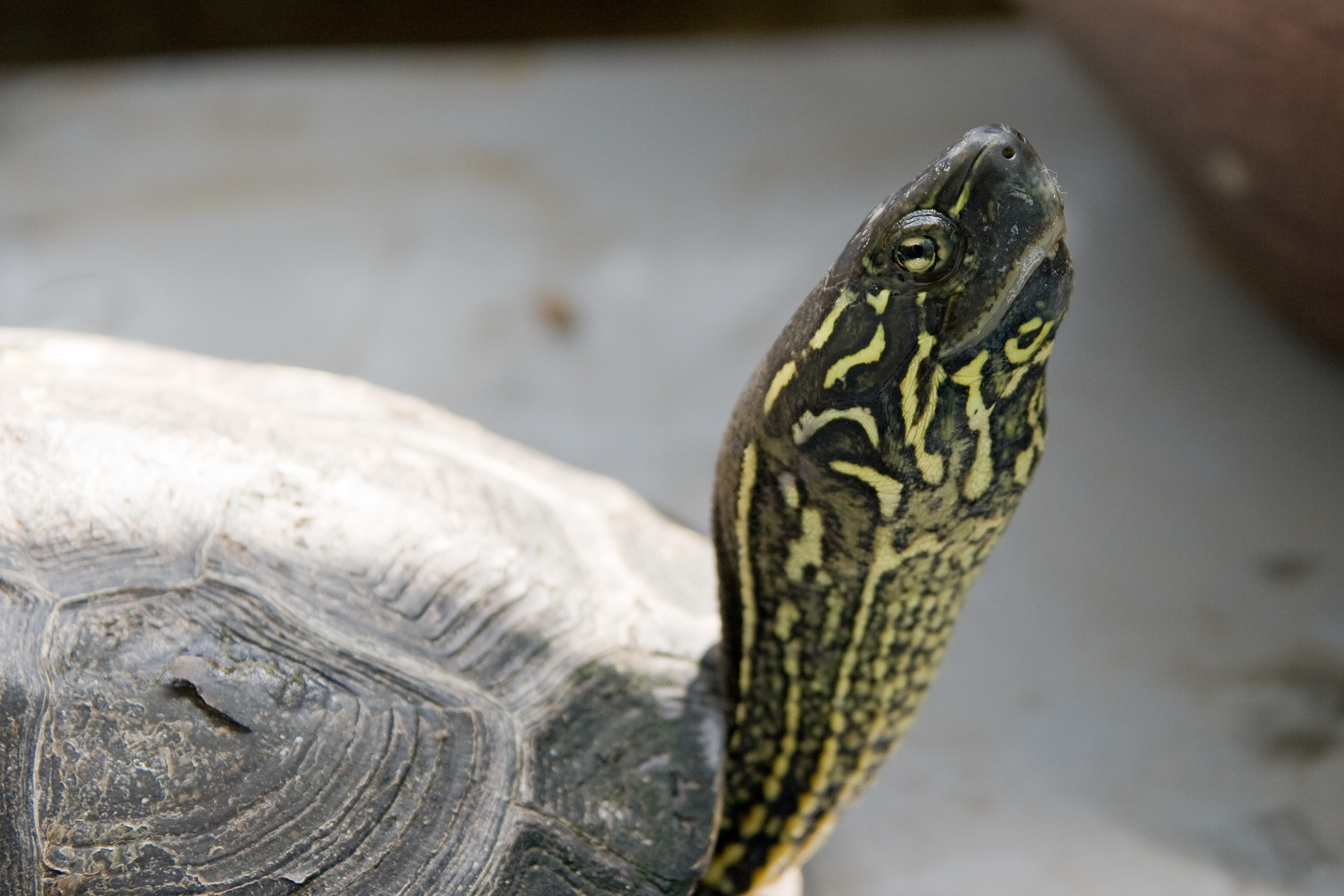

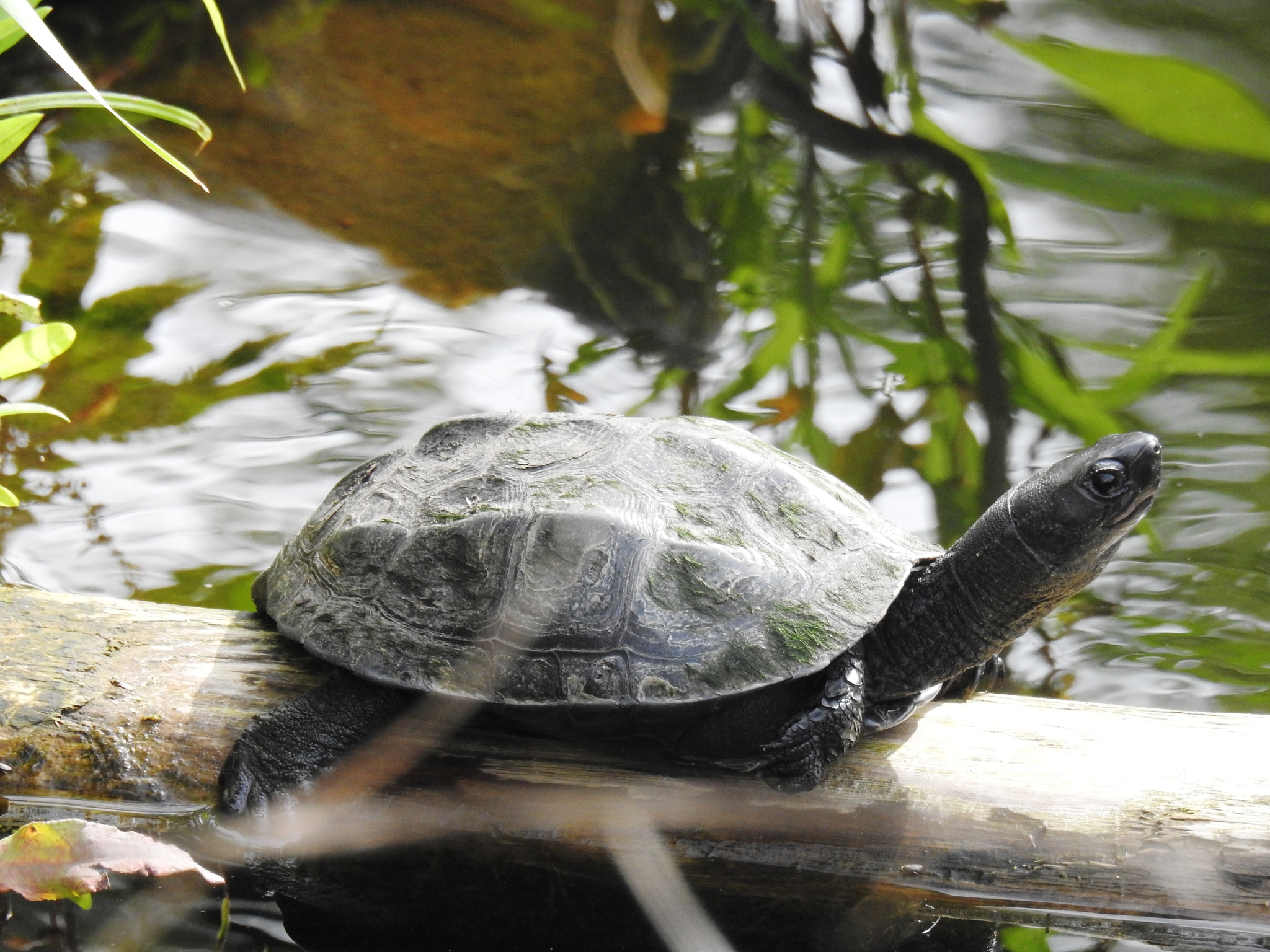
Melanistic male, in Japan (introduced)

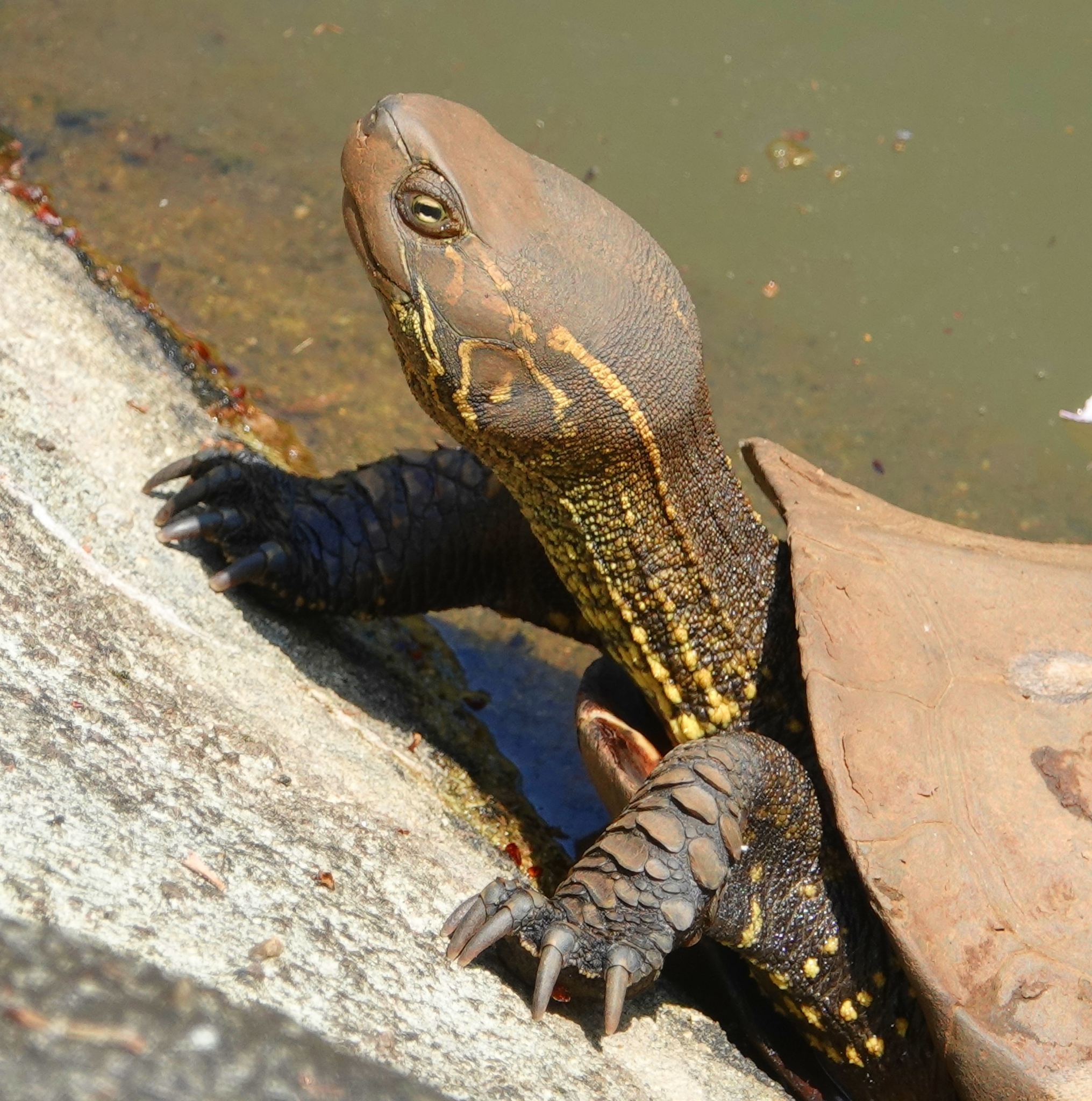
In Japan (introduced)

== Geographic range ==
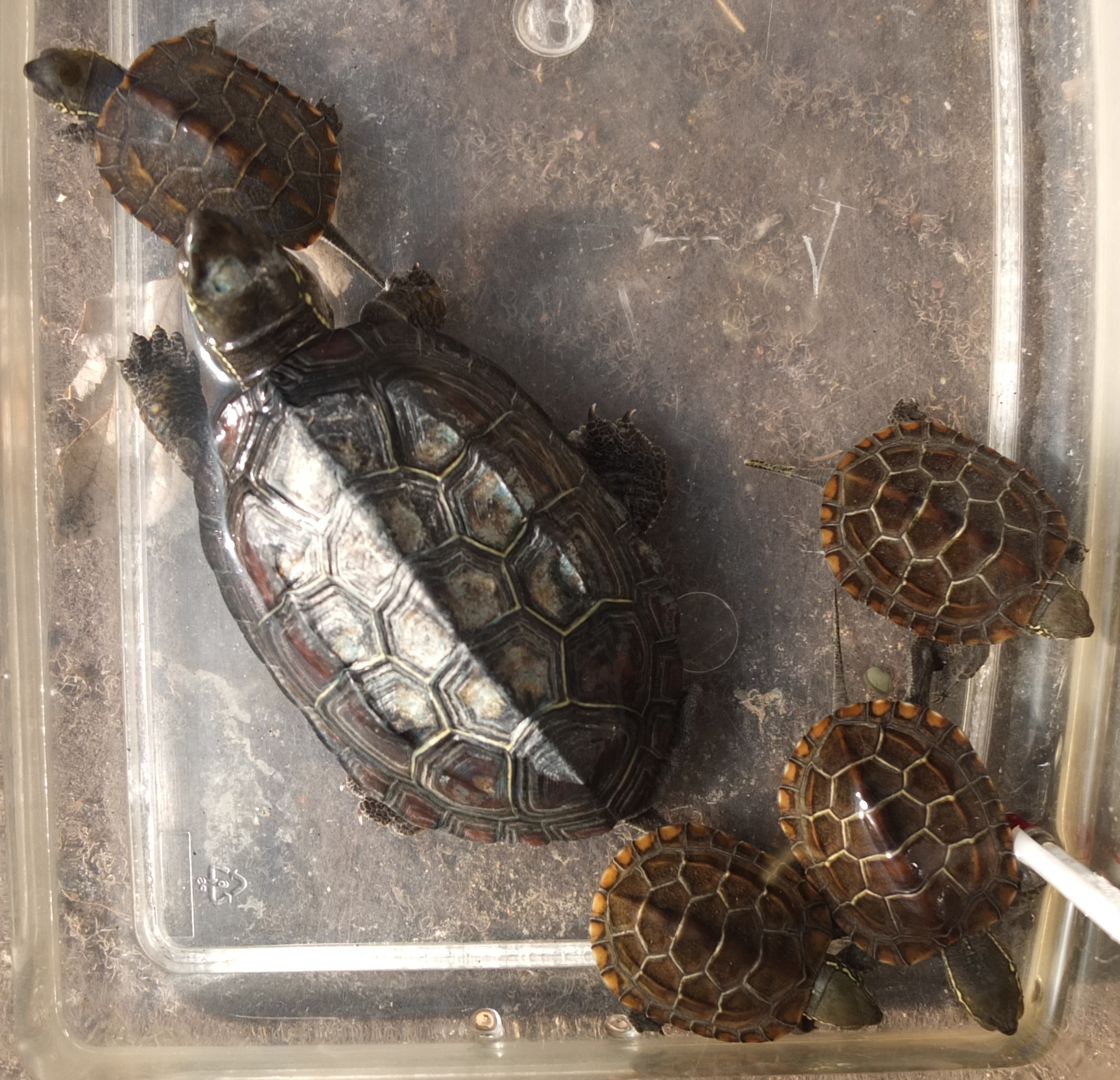
Adult and young Reeve's turtles

Mauremys reevesii is native to China and Korea, and is thought to have been introduced to Japan and Taiwan in historic times; it was previously thought to be native to both these regions. The species is thought to have been introduced to Japan from the Korean Peninsula near the end of the 18th century. Introduced populations of M. reevesii may serve as a threat to the native turtles of these regions due to its propensity for hybridization.

=== East Timor ===
During surveys in East Timor (Timor-Leste), a small but well-established population of M. reevesii was found living in marshes near the city of Dili. The species is not native to the island and was possibly introduced by locals of Chinese origin. East Timor is home to the Roti Island snake-necked turtle (Chelodina mccordi), more specifically the subspecies C. m. timorensis (sometimes considered a species of its own). Although the introduced population of M. reevesii is not known to present a risk to the native turtles per se, they could indirectly present a threat to the natives if confused. M. reevesii from the introduced population are sometimes captured to be sold to people of Chinese origin and this may cause problems if extended to the native turtles. A potential solution is to remove the introduced M. reevesii (thereby restricting the trade to captive farmed M. reevesii).

== Habitat and behaviour ==
M. reevesii is semiaquatic, and basks in the sun on rocks or logs and can often be found leaving water to do so. They can usually be found in marshes, relatively shallow ponds, streams, and canals with muddy or sandy bottoms.

== Conservation status ==
The Chinese three-keeled pond turtle (M. reevesii) is threatened by competition with released pet red-eared sliders (Trachemys scripta elegans), overhunting (its plastron is used in traditional Chinese medicine), capturing for the pet trade, and wild habitat destruction. The IUCN considers M. reevesii an endangered species. This species, fortunately, breeds well in captivity.

== Etymology ==
The specific name, reevesii, is in honor of English naturalist John Reeves.

== Hybridization ==
This species, Mauremys reevesii, is notorious for its ability to produce hybrids with other Geoemydidae, even species that are only distantly related. The supposed new species "Mauremys pritchardi " was based on a hybrid of unknown origin between a male of this species and a female yellow pond turtle (Mauremys mutica). Furthermore, it has hybridized with the Chinese stripe-necked turtle (Ocadia sinensis), female Malayan box turtles (Cuora amboinensis), a male four-eyed turtle (Sacalia quadriocellata), and the Japanese pond turtle (Mauremys japonica) in captivity. This hybridization may pose a threat to the populations of native M. mutica and Chinese stripe-necked turtle (M. sinensis) in Taiwan, and the endemic M. japonica in Japan.

== Farming ==
Chinese pond turtle in Tokyo.

High demand for turtle plastrons for Shang divination rites and archaeological findings of large caches of turtle shells has led some scholars to speculate that Mauremys reevesii may have been farmed for this purpose in antiquity.

M. reevesii is one of the species raised on China's modern-day turtle farms. According to a 1998 survey, 548 farms raised this turtle species in four provinces in China. The statistical data from different provinces were in different formats; however, two provinces reported 20,650 turtles living on 26 farms, with 5,000 animals reproduced annually; the other two provinces reported the total weight of their turtles, namely some 260 tons of these animals on 522 farms. Over the five-year period, 1990–1995, 13 traditional Chinese medicine factories consumed 430 tons of C. reevesii plastrons.

Based on a more recent (2002) survey of 684 Chinese turtle farms (less than half of all 1,499 turtle farms that were registered at the time), researchers found that 2.8 million of turtles of this species (reported there as Chinemys reevesii) lived on these farms, with some 566,000 specimens sold by farmers every year. The total weight of the annual product was 320 tons, with the estimated value of over US$6 million, which makes the market value of a Chinese pond turtle equal to around $12—about twice as much that of the most common farmed species, Pelodiscus sinensis. Taking into account the registered farms that did not respond to the survey, as well as the unregistered producers, the total amounts must be considerably higher.

=== Pet trade ===
Chinese pond turtles are farmed for the pet trade. In captivity, they require similar care to red-eared sliders (T. s. elegans).
