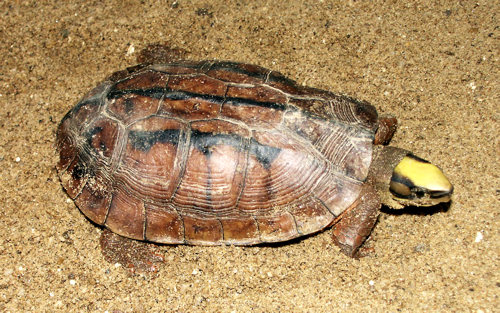

Conservation status
- Critically Endangered (IUCN 3.1)
- CITES Appendix II

Scientific classification
- Kingdom: Animalia
- Phylum: Chordata
- Class: Reptilia
- Order: Testudines
- Suborder: Cryptodira
- Family: Geoemydidae
- Genus: Cuora
- Species: C. trifasciata

Binomial name
- Cuora trifasciata (Bell, 1825)

Synonyms
- List: Sternothaerus trifasciatus Bell, 1825; Emys (Cistuda) trifasciata — Gray, 1831; Cistuda trifasciata — Gray, 1831; Cistudo trifasciata — A.M.C. Duméril & Bibron, 1835; Cuora trifasciata — Gray, 1856; Pyxidemys trifasciata — Fitzinger, 1861; Terrapene trifasciata — Strauch, 1862; Cyclemys trifasciata — Boulenger, 1889; Cuora [cyclornata] cyclornata Blanck, McCord & Le, 2006; Cuora cyclornata meieri Blanck, McCord & Le, 2006; Pyxiclemmys trifasciata — Vetter, 2006; Cuora trifasciata — Zhou, McCord, Blanck & P. Li, 2007

= Golden coin turtle =

Species of turtle

The golden coin turtle (Cuora trifasciata), also known commonly as the Chinese three-banded box turtle and the Chinese three-striped box turtle, is a species of turtle in the family Geoemydidae. The species is native to southern China. It has two recognized subspecies.

== Geographic range ==
C. trifasciata is distributed in China, but only on the island of Hainan (it is extirpated from the mainland Guangdong, Guangxi, and Fujian provinces), as well as Hong Kong. The populations from Vietnam and Laos are now regarded as a separate species, the Vietnamese three-striped box turtle (C. cyclornata).

== Description ==
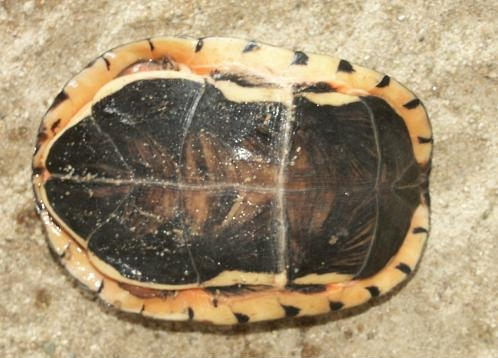
Plastron

C. trifasciata has three distinct black stripes on its brown carapace, with a yellow, slightly hooked upper jaw and a yellow stripe extending from the back of the mouth. The plastron is mostly black with a yellow border.

== Subspecies ==
Two subspecies are recognized as being valid, including the nominotypical subspecies.

- Cuora trifasciata luteocephala Blanck, Protiva, Zhou, Y. Li, Crow & Tiedemann, 2017
- Cuora trifasciata trifasciata (Bell, 1825)

Nota bene: A trinomial authority in parentheses indicates that the subspecies was originally described in a genus other than Cuora.

== Diet ==
In Hong Kong, C. trifasciata feeds mainly on fishes, frogs, and carrion, but remains of crabs, snails, and insects have also been found in its feces. It can grow up to a straight-line carapace length of 25 cm (10 in).

== Hybridization ==
C. trifasciata hybridizes very easily with its relatives in captivity and in the wild, and hybrids may be fertile. Several of these have been described as new species, such as the Fujian pond turtle (Mauremys × iversoni), a hybrid between (usually) males of this species and females of the Asian yellow pond turtle (Mauremys mutica). In addition, the golden coin turtle is suspected to be a parent of two supposed species, the Chinese false-eyed turtle and Philippen's striped turtle.

== Conservation ==
The species C. trifasciata is considered critically endangered by the IUCN. It is used in folk medicine, e.g. as the key ingredient for the Chinese medicinal dessert guīlínggāo (龜苓膏); thus, it is under threat because of unsustainable hunting. It is one of the most endangered turtle species in the world, according to a 2003 assessment by the IUCN. C. trifasciata is listed among Turtle Conservation Coalition's 25 most endangered tortoises and freshwater turtles.

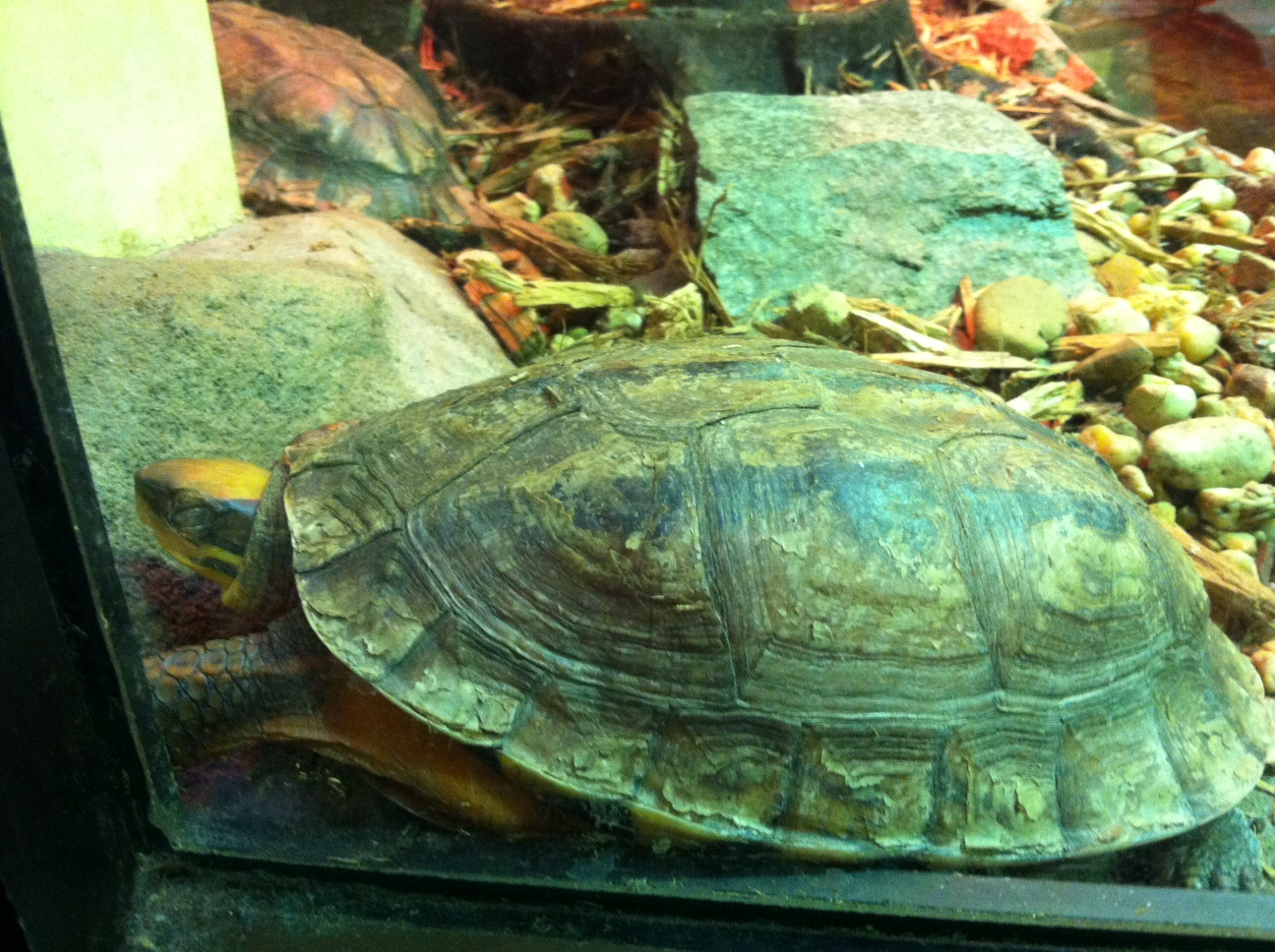
Captive specimen on display at the Smithsonian National Zoological Park, Washington, DC

== Farming ==
C. trifasciata is raised on some of China's turtle farms. Based on the data from a large sample (almost one-half of all registered turtle farms in the country), researchers estimated that the turtle farmers participating in the survey had the total herd of 115,900 turtles of this species; they sold 20,600 turtles of this species per year, with the estimated value of almost US$37 million. This would make a farm-raised C. trifasciata worth almost $1,800, making them by far the most expensive species tabulated in the survey (by comparison, a common Pelodiscus sinensis raised for food would be worth under $7, and a Cuora mouhotii, sold for the pet trade, around $80). Taking into account the registered farms that did not respond to the survey, as well as the unregistered producers, the total numbers must be significantly higher. Wild C. trifasciata turtles are far more valuable than farmed-raised turtles of this species to both traditional Chinese medicine practitioners and illegal wildlife traders. The gender of C. trifasciata is determined by gestation temperatures. Due to incubation temperatures at farms in warm lowlands, farms have only been able to produce females. This increased the price of wild-caught males to $20,000. Most farmed C. trifasciata turtles are hybrids, which can escape and establish populations, causing genetic pollution.

The largest C. trifasciata farming operation is said to be located in Boluo County, Guangdong. According to the farm's founder Li Yi (李艺), the farm was started in 1989 with eight wild turtles (two males and six females) bought at a local market, and now has "over 2000" turtles. According to the farm's site, captive-born turtles start breeding at 8 years of age.
