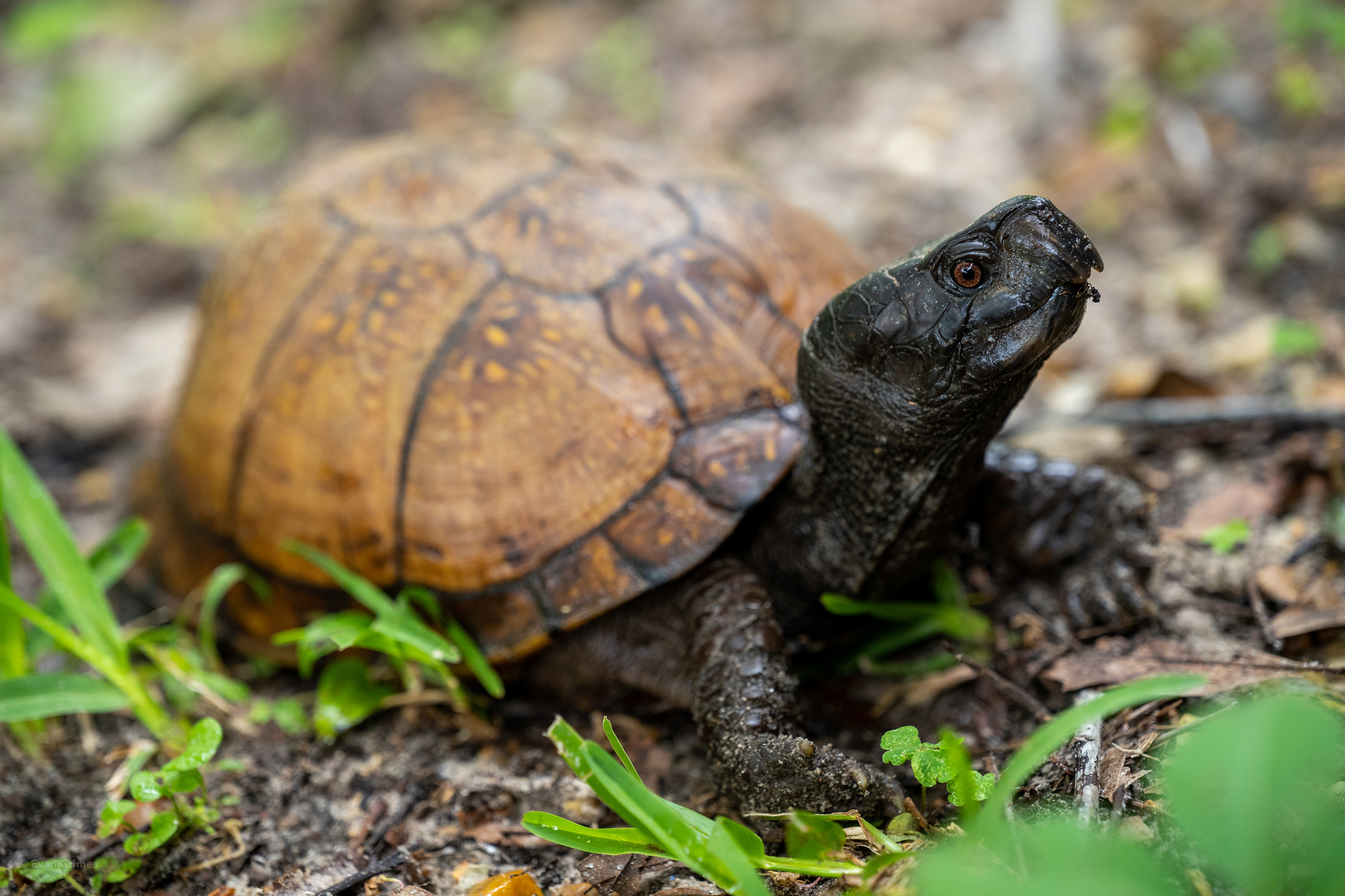
- Male

Conservation status
- CITES Appendix II

Scientific classification
- Kingdom: Animalia
- Phylum: Chordata
- Class: Reptilia
- Order: Testudines
- Suborder: Cryptodira
- Family: Emydidae
- Genus: Terrapene
- Species: T. carolina
- Subspecies: T. c. major

Trinomial name
- Terrapene carolina major (Agassiz, 1857)

Synonyms
- List: Cistudo major Agassiz, 1857; Cistudo carolina var. major – Boulenger, 1889; Terrapene major – Baur, 1891; Toxaspis major – Cope, 1895; Terrapene major – M.J. Allen, 1932; Terrapene carolina major – Carr, 1940; Terrapene major major – Wilms, 1999

= Gulf Coast box turtle =

Subspecies of turtle

The Gulf Coast box turtle (Terrapene carolina major) is the largest subspecies of the common box turtle (Terrapene carolina).

== Taxonomy and systematics ==
T. c. major is the most closely related subspecies to the Pleistocene fossil subspecies †T. c. putnami (Giant box turtle). Indeed, T. c. major likely came about as a result of hybridization between T. c. putnami and various other T. carolina subspecies. No physical differences between the two have been found other than T. c. putnami's larger size. As a result, it has been suggested that the two should be considered one and the same, such that T. c. putnami becomes a synonym of T. c. major.

Intergrading with other subspecies of the common box turtle that it shares its range with is not uncommon.

== Distribution ==
The Gulf Coast box turtle is found only along the Gulf Coastal Plain, in the U.S. states of Alabama, Florida, Georgia, Louisiana, and Mississippi.

== Habitat ==
They are often found around estuaries and swampy regions, near shallow, permanent bodies of water.

== Description ==
The Gulf Coast box turtle has the largest body size out of all the common box turtle subspecies, possibly as a result of its close relation to the extinct giant box turtle (T. c. putnami). Males are larger than females, and have a concavity in the plastron to aid with mounting during mating. Large males may have a midline carapace length of over 20 cm (7.9 in).

Gulf Coast box turtles exhibit a very high degree of morphological variability, which may hinder distinguishing them from sympatric subspecies such as T. c. carolina, T. c. bauri, and T. c. triunguis.

It is generally dark brown or black in color, with yellow striping or blotching, the amount of blotching or striping can vary greatly.

== Behaviour ==
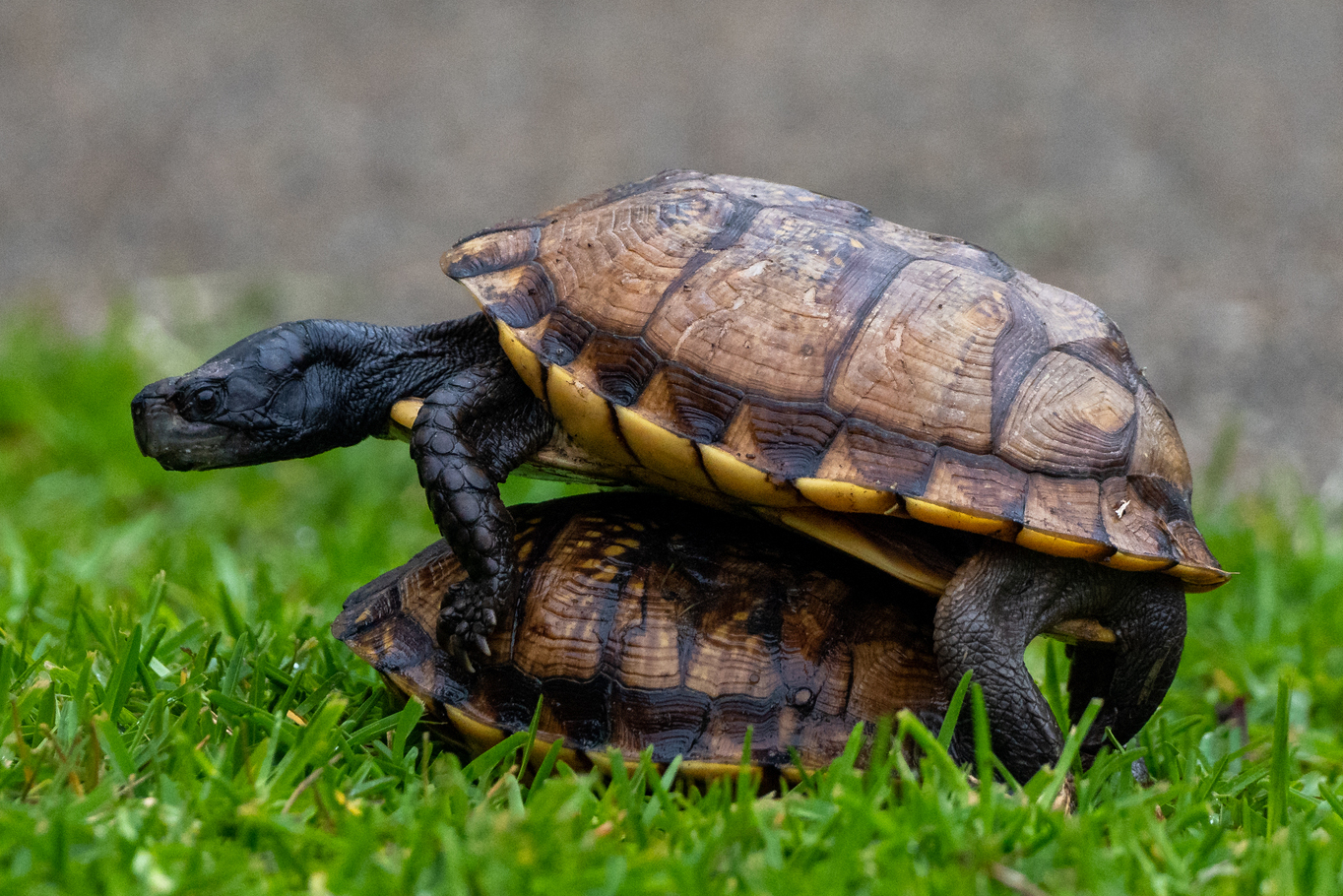
Mating

Males are territorial, and fight each other by biting and attempting to flip each other over. Gulf Coast box turtles frequent bodies of water more often than other T. carolina subspecies.

Females roam further and more frequently than males, making them more susceptible to human threats such as vehicle collisions, collection, and land use.
