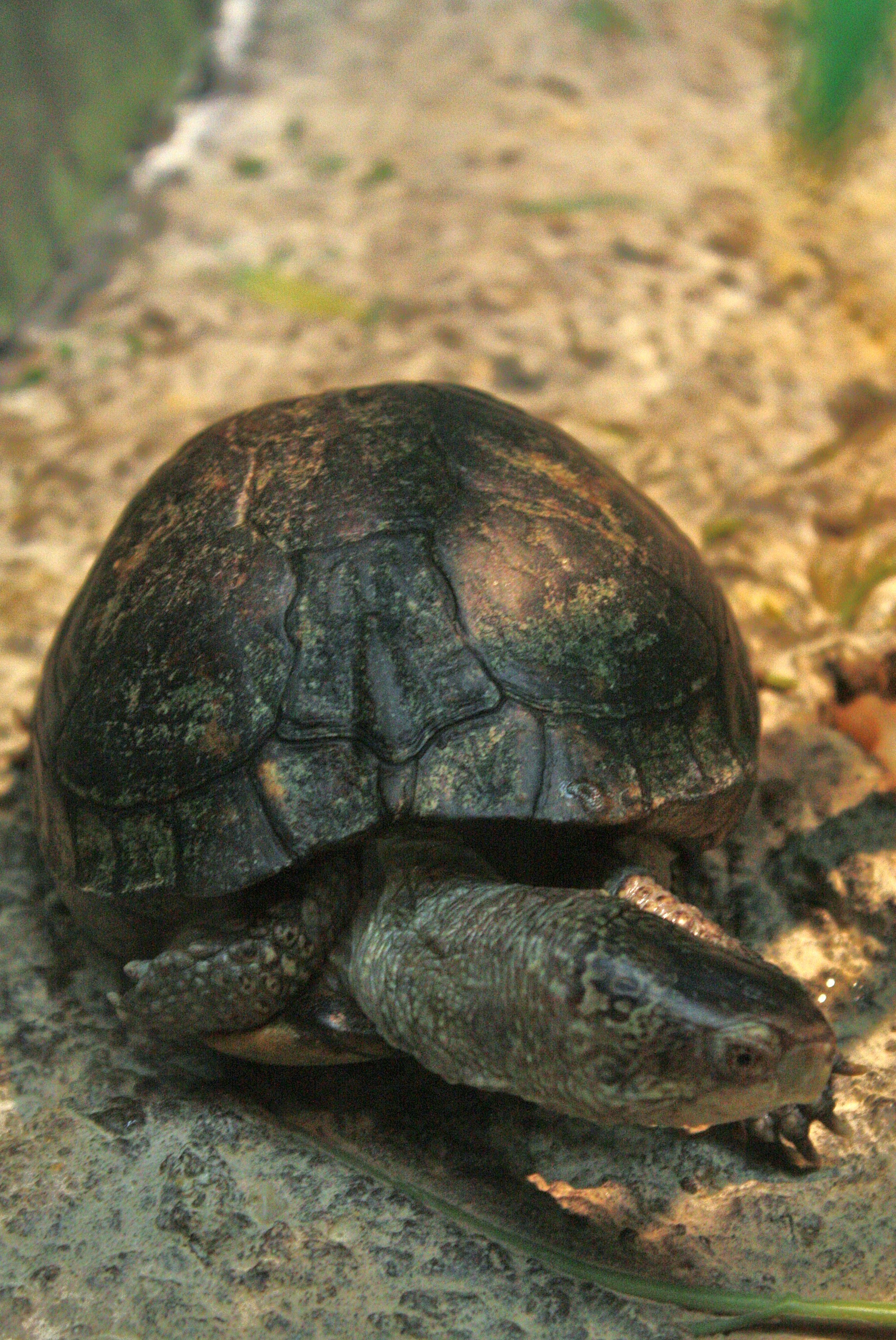
- Coahuilan box turtle (Terrapene coahuila) at the Columbus Zoo and Aquarium

Conservation status
- Endangered (IUCN 3.1)
- CITES Appendix I

Scientific classification
- Kingdom: Animalia
- Phylum: Chordata
- Class: Reptilia
- Order: Testudines
- Suborder: Cryptodira
- Family: Emydidae
- Genus: Terrapene
- Species: T. coahuila

Binomial name
- Terrapene coahuila Schmidt & Owens, 1944

Synonyms
- Terrapene coahuila Schmidt & Owens, 1944; Terrapene ornata coahuila — Mertens & Wermuth, 1955; Terrapene coahuilae Milstead, 1960 (ex errore); Terrapene coahulia Milstead, 1969 (ex errore); Terapene coahuila — Nietzke, 1973; Terrepene coahuila — Morafka, 1977; Terrepene coahuilae — Morafka, 1977; Terrapene cohauila Ferri, 2002 (ex errore)

= Coahuilan box turtle =

Species of turtle

The Coahuilan box turtle (Terrapene coahuila), also known commonly as the aquatic box turtle, is an endangered species of turtle in the family Emydidae. Unlike the other members of the genus Terrapene, this turtle spends roughly 90% of its time in water.

It is a close relative to the common box turtle (Terrapene carolina). Researchers have therefore suggested that it developed from a nonaquatic species in order to survive in the desert springs of Cuatro Ciénegas.

== Geographic range ==
Terrapene coahuila is endemic to the vicinity of Cuatro Ciénegas in Coahuila, Mexico. Within an area of less than 800 km^{2} (300 sq mi), there are several distinct pockets of this species. During the rainy season, Coahuilan box turtles may leave their home range and travel throughout the desert.

== Description ==
The body of Terrapene coahuila is adapted for spending long periods of time in the water, and the shell is often covered in algae. Just like any other box turtle, it has a hinged plastron that can be completely closed. The skin is dark, usually dark brown and dark gray, but some areas can appear completely black.

== Diet ==
Terrapene coahuila is an opportunistic feeder that will devour both plants and other animals. It will for instance eat fly larvae, dragonfly nymphs, beetles, true bugs, spiders, reptiles, fish, crayfish, mushrooms, and plant matter (such as Chara and Eleocharis spp.) in the wild.

== Reproduction ==
Mating in Terrapene coahuila takes place in shallow water from September to June, and eggs are laid from May to September. The eggs are laid in small clutches, typically consisting of just 2 to 3 eggs per clutch.

== Predation ==
Raccoons and eastern copperheads eat the eggs of Coahuilan box turtles. Raccoons also prey on hatchlings and adults. Virginia opossums and striped skunks are also predators of this turtle. Coyotes are potential predators of this turtle.
