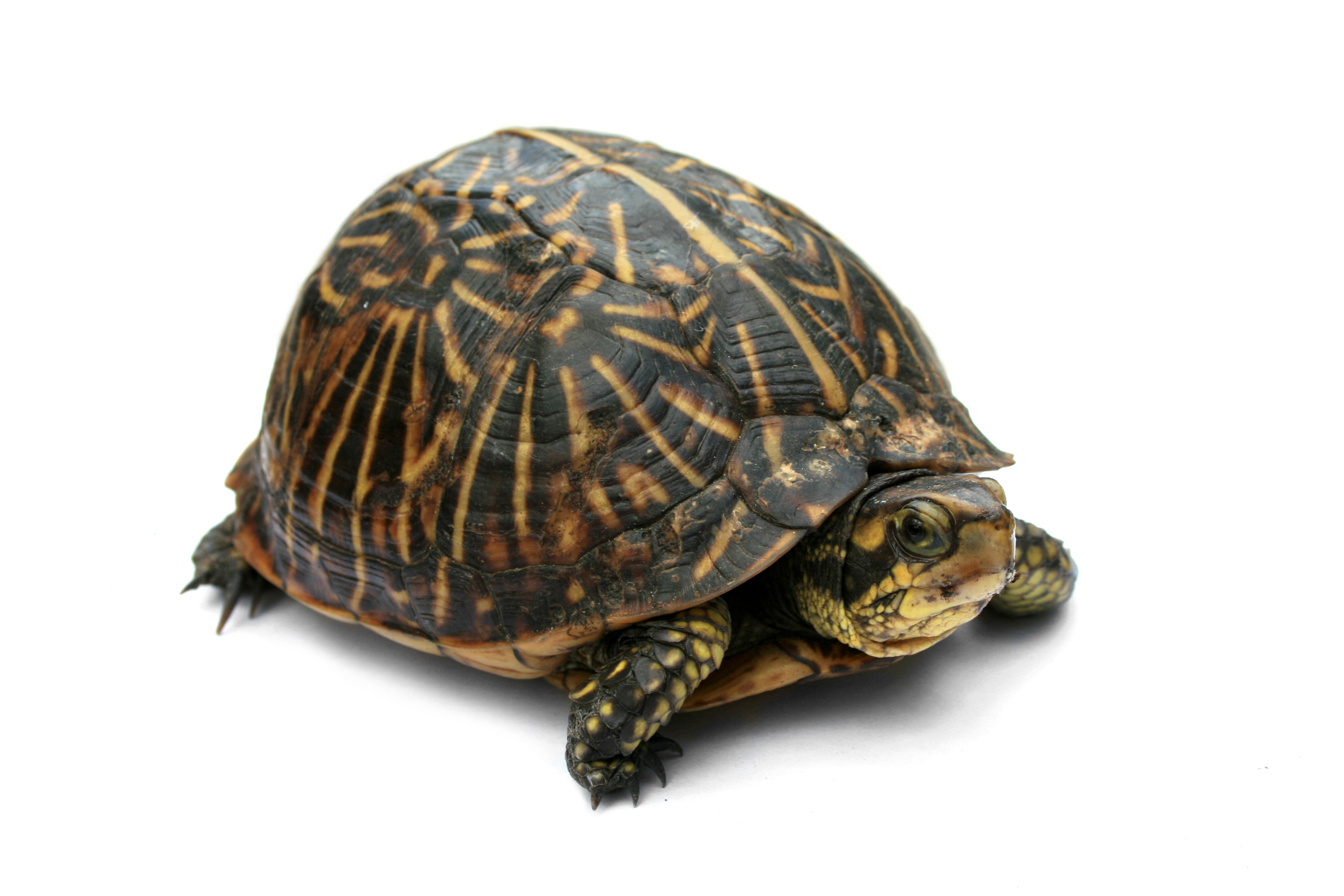
- Florida box turtle, Terrapene carolina bauri

Scientific classification
- Kingdom: Animalia
- Phylum: Chordata
- Class: Reptilia
- Order: Testudines
- Suborder: Cryptodira
- Family: Emydidae
- Subfamily: Emydinae
- Genus: Terrapene; Merrem, 1820

Type species
- Terrapene carolina (Linnaeus, 1758)

Species
- Terrapene carolina Terrapene coahuila Terrapene mexicana Terrapene nelsoni Terrapene ornata Terrapene triunguis Terrapene yucatana

Synonyms
- Cistuda Fleming, 1822; Diducla Rafinesque, 1832; Pyxidemys Fitzinger, 1835; Emyoides Gray, 1844; Onychotria Gray, 1849; Pariemys Cope, 1895; Toxaspis Cope, 1895

= North American box turtle =

North American box turtle Temporal range: Miocene - Recent, 15–0 Ma

North American land turtles of the genus Terrapene

North American box turtles are land turtles of the genus Terrapene. Although box turtles are superficially similar to tortoises in terrestrial habits and overall appearance, they are actually members of the American pond turtle family (Emydidae). The 12 taxa which are distinguished in the genus are distributed over seven species. They are largely characterized by having a domed shell which is hinged at the bottom, allowing the animal to retract its head and legs and close its shell tightly to protect itself from predators.

== Taxonomy and genetics ==
The genus name Terrapene was coined by Blasius Merrem in 1820 as a genus separate from Emys, describing those species which had a sternum separated into two or three divisions, and which could move these parts independently. He placed in this genus, among others, Terrapene boscii (now accepted to be Kinosternon subrubrum subrubrum) and Terrapene carolina (but under the name Terrapene clausa). Also several Asian box turtles have been formerly classified within the genus Terrapene; e.g., Terrapene bicolor (now Cuora amboinensis couro) and Terrapene culturalia (now Cuora flavomarginata). Currently, seven species are classified within the genus and 12 taxa are distinguished:

- Common box turtle, Terrapene carolina (Linnaeus, 1758) (type species)
  - Florida box turtle, Terrapene carolina bauri W.E. Taylor, 1895
  - Eastern box turtle, Terrapene carolina carolina (Linnaeus, 1758)
  - Gulf Coast box turtle, Terrapene carolina major (Agassiz, 1857)
  - Terrapene carolina putnami O.P. Hay, 1906 (extinct)
- Three-toed box turtle, Terrapene triunguis (Agassiz, 1857)
- Coahuilan box turtle, Terrapene coahuila Schmidt & Owens, 1944
- Mexican box turtle, Terrapene mexicana (Gray, 1849)
- Spotted box turtle, Terrapene nelsoni Stejneger, 1925
  - Northern spotted box turtle, Terrapene nelsoni klauberi Bogert, 1943
  - Southern spotted box turtle, Terrapene nelsoni nelsoni Stejneger, 1925
- Western box turtle, Terrapene ornata, (Agassiz, 1857)
  - Ornate box turtle, Terrapene ornata ornata (Agassiz, 1857)
  - Desert box turtle, Terrapene ornata luteola H.M. Smith & Ramsey, 1952
- Yucatán box turtle, Terrapene yucatana (Boulenger, 1895)

Box turtles have diploid somatic cells with 50 chromosomes.

== Ecology and behavior ==
=== Life cycle and predation ===
Once maturity is reached, the chance of death seems not to increase with age. The survivorship curve of box turtles is therefore probably similar to that of other long-living turtles. The average life span of adult box turtles is 50 years, while a significant portion lives over 100 years. The age of a growing box turtle in the wild cannot be accurately estimated by counting the growth rings on the scutes; Their growth is directly affected by the amount of food, types of food, water, illness, and more. Box turtle eggs are flexible, oblong and are (depending on the taxon) on average 2–4 cm long weighing 5-11 g. The normal clutch size is 1-7 eggs. In captivity and in the southern end of their range, box turtles can have more than one clutch per year, while the average clutch size is larger in more northern populations. Delayed fertility has been observed in female turtles during which a box turtle pair will mate and the female will hold onto the male's sperm within the cloaca for a period of months or even years before fertilizing and laying a clutch of eggs

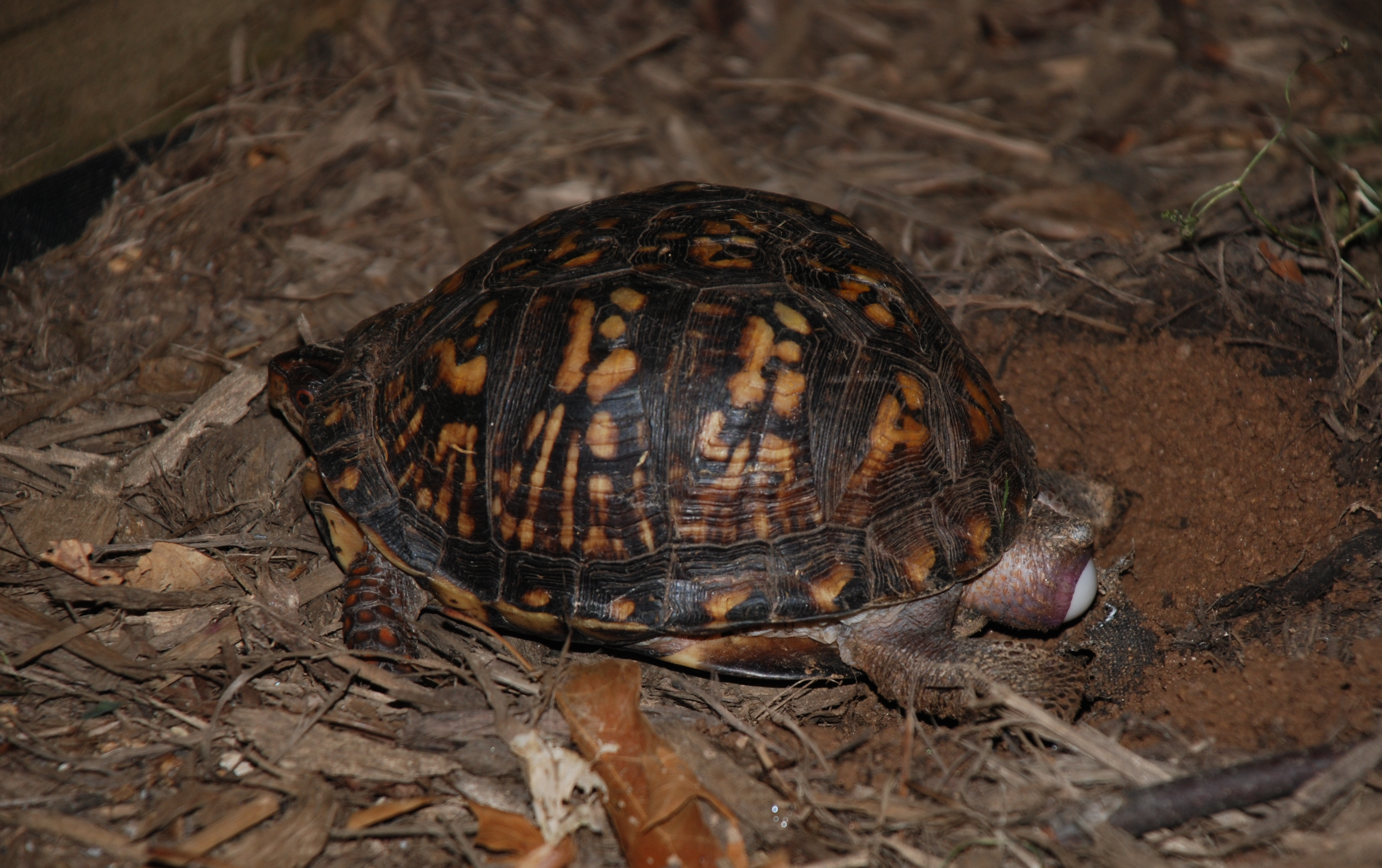
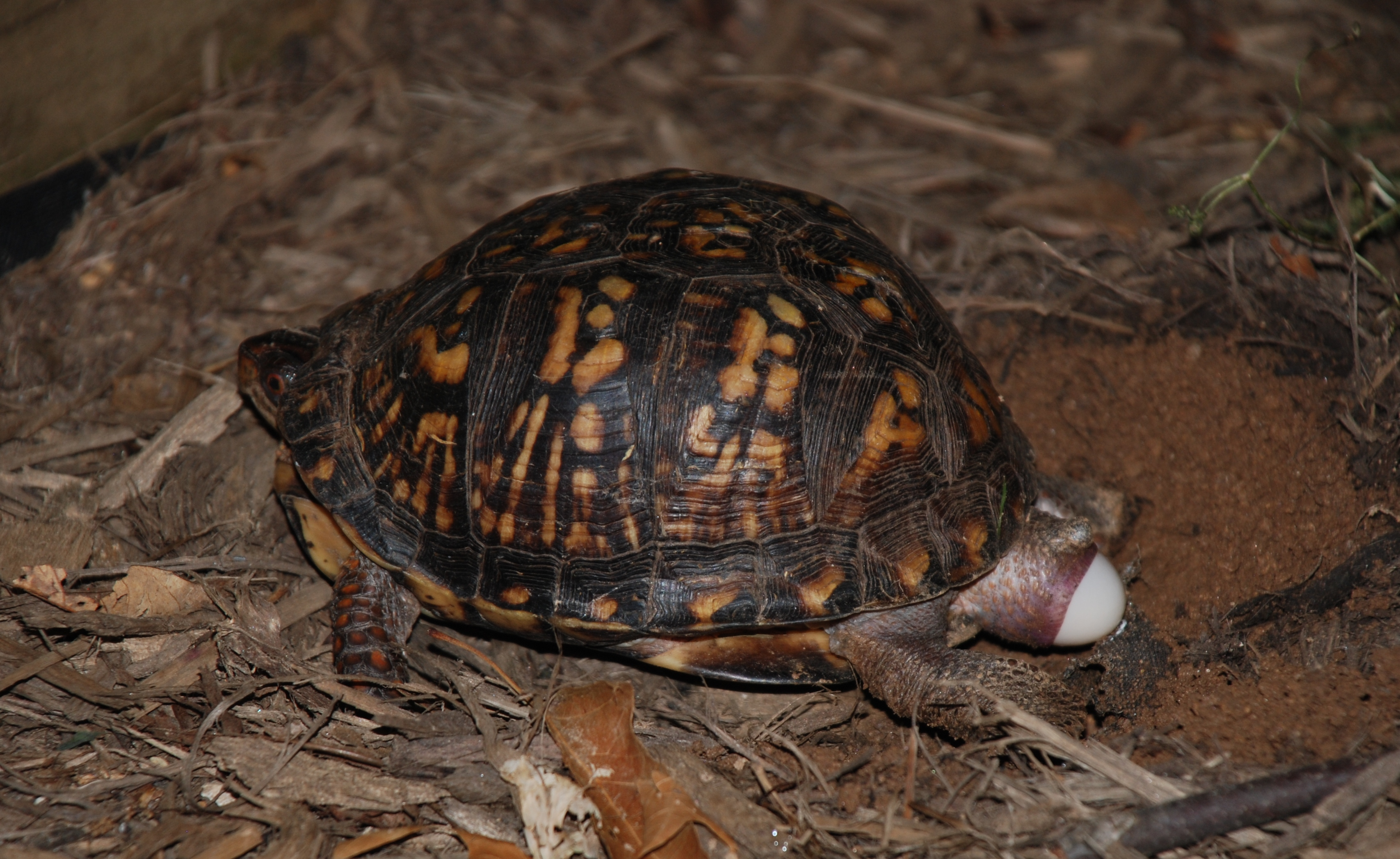
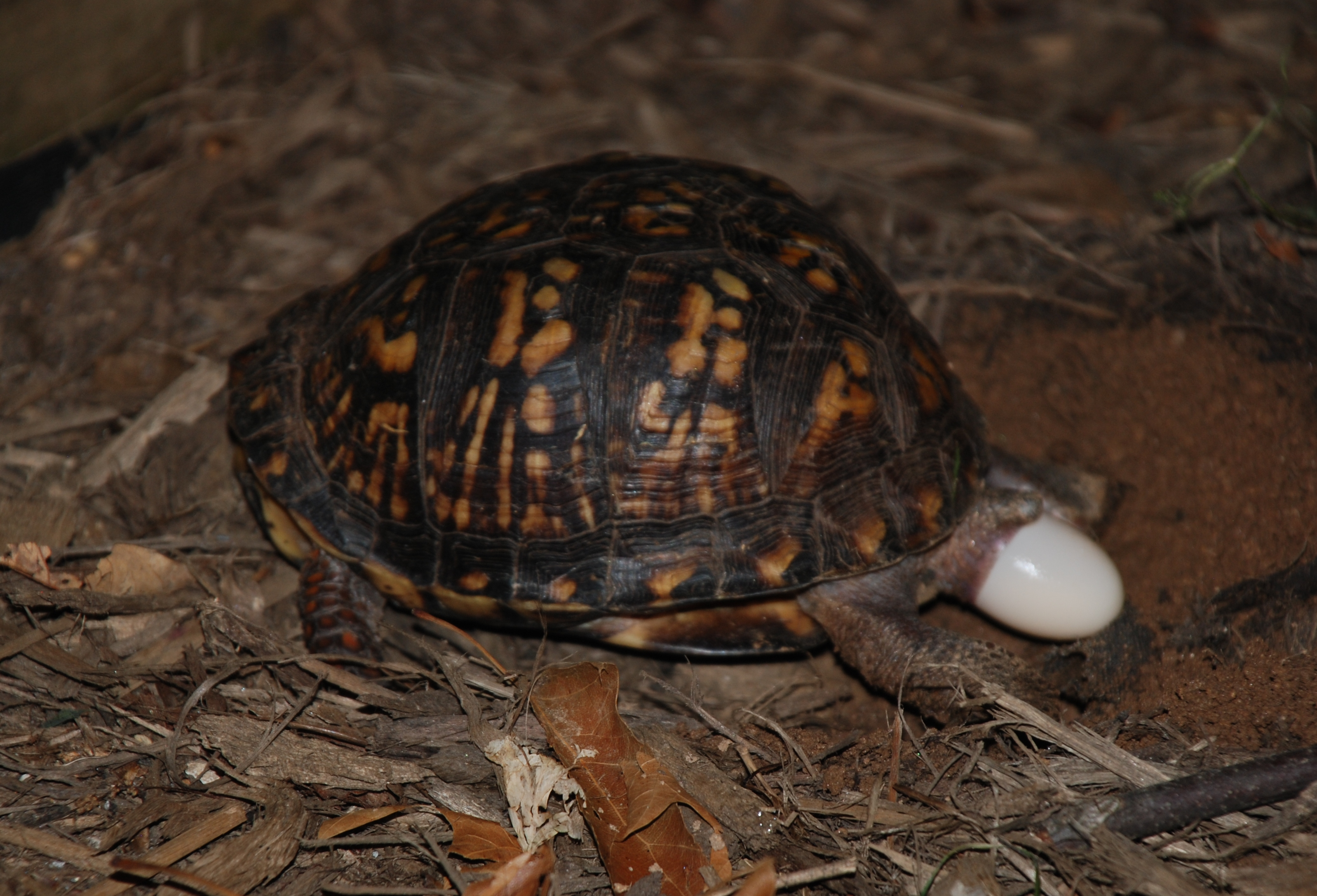
T. c. carolina laying eggs

Turtles can defend themselves from predation by hiding, closing their shell and biting. The risk of death is greatest in small animals due to their size and weaker carapace and plastron. While the shell of an adult box turtle is seldom fractured, the box turtle is still vulnerable to surprise attacks and persistent gnawing or pecking. Common predators are mammals like minks, skunks, raccoons, dogs and rodents, but also birds (e.g. crows, ravens) and snakes (e.g. racers, cottonmouths) are known to kill box turtles.

=== Diet ===
North American box turtles are omnivores with a varied diet, as a box turtle will "basically eat anything it can catch". Invertebrates (amongst others insects, earth worms, millipedes) form the principal component, but the diet also consists for a large part (reports range from 30 to 90%) of vegetation. The diet is amended with fruits (amongst others from cacti, apples and several species of berry) and gastropods (Heliosoma, Succinea). While reports exist that during their first five to six years, box turtles are primarily carnivorous and adults are mostly herbivorous, there is no scientific basis for such a difference.

== Distribution and habitat ==
Distribution of the four species of Terrapene

Box turtles are native to North America. The widest distributed species is the common box turtle which is found in the United States (subspecies carolina, major, bauri, triunguis; south-central, eastern, and southeastern parts) and Mexico (subspecies yukatana and mexicana; Yucatán peninsula and northeastern parts). The western box turtle is endemic to the south-central and southwestern parts of the U.S. (and adjacent Mexico) while the spotted box turtle is endemic to northwestern Mexico only. The Coahuilan box turtle is only found in Cuatro Ciénegas Basin (Coahuila, Mexico).

=== Habitat ===
Because box turtles occupy a wide variety of habitats (which both vary on a day-to-day, season-to-season, but also species-to-species basis), a standard box turtle habitat cannot be identified. Mesic woodlands are a habitat where box turtles are generally found. T. ornata is the only species regularly found in grasslands, but its subspecies the desert box turtle is also found in the semidesert with rainfall predominantly in summer. The single location where Coahuilan box turtles are found is a 360 km^{2} region characterized by marshes, permanent presence of water and several types of cacti.

Prior to hibernation, box turtles tend to move further into the woods, where they dig a chamber for overwintering. Ornate box turtles dig chambers up to 50 centimeters, while eastern box turtles hibernate at depth of about 10 centimeters. The location for overwintering can be up to 0.5 km from the summer habitat and is often in close proximity to that of the previous year. In more southern locations, turtles are active year-round, as has been observed for T. coahuila and T. c. major. Other box turtles in higher temperatures are more active (T. c. yukatana) or only active during the wet seasons.

=== Evolution ===
Box turtles appeared "abruptly in the fossil record, essentially in modern form". The absence of strong changes in their morphology might indicate that they are a generalist species. It is therefore complicated to establish how their evolution from other turtles took place. The oldest finds of fossilized box turtles were found in Nebraska (U.S.), date from about 15 million years before present (in the Miocene) and resemble the aquatic species T. coahuila most, which indicates that the common ancestor was also an aquatic species. Fossilized specimens of T. ornata and T. carolina were dated circa 5 million years before present and indicated that those main lineages also already diverged within the Miocene. The only recognized extinct subspecies (T. c. putnami) dates from the Pliocene and was, with a carapace length of 30 cm (12 in), much larger than other species.

== Interaction with humans ==
=== Conservation status ===
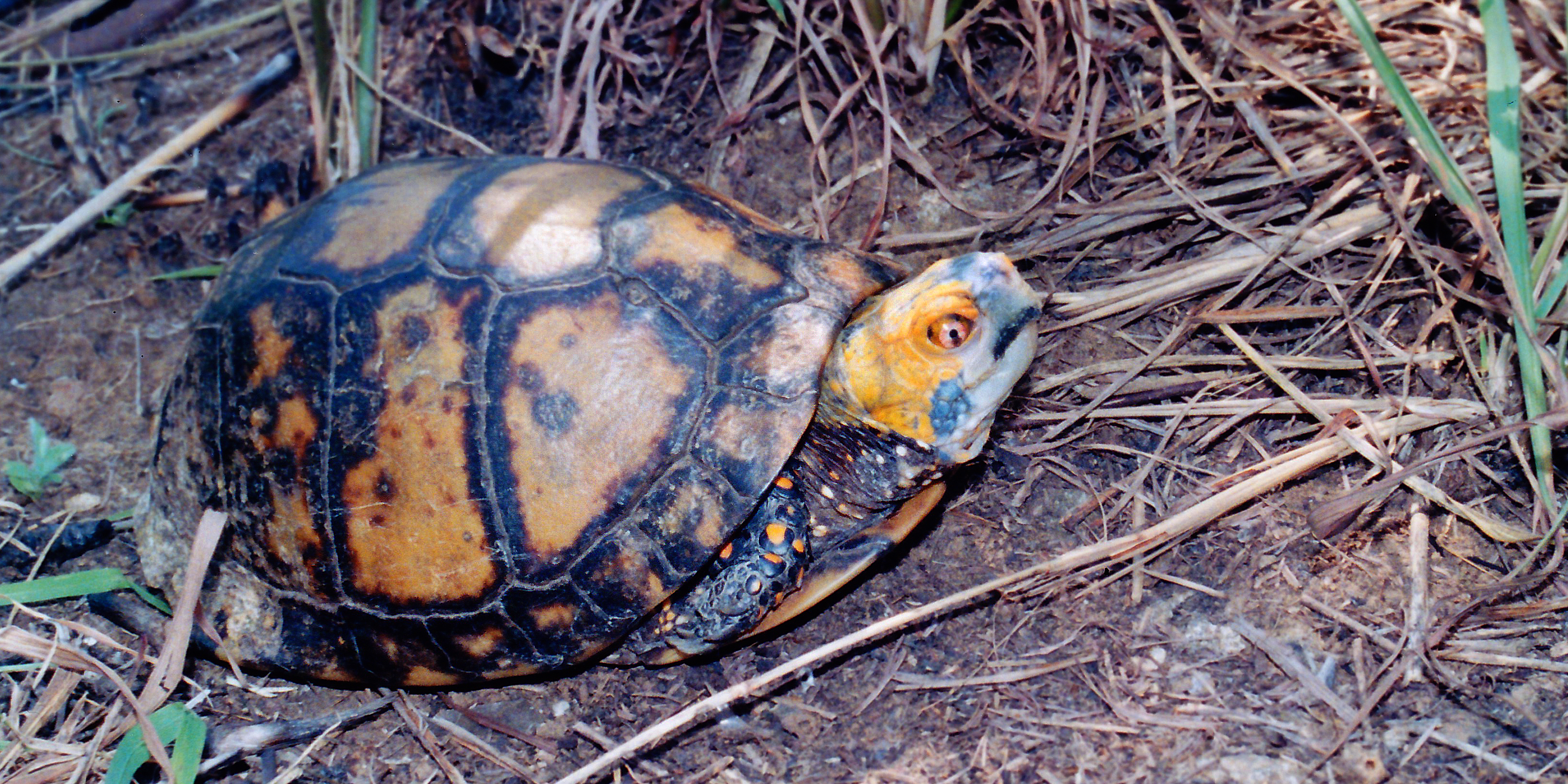
Mexican box turtle (Terrapene mexicana) in southern Tamaulipas, Mexico

As the conservation status is defined for a species and not for a genus, differences exist between the different species in the genus Terrapene. Terrapene coahuila, as it is endemic only to Coahuila, is classified as endangered. While its geographic range reduced by 40% to 360 km^{2} in the past 40–50 years, the population of this species reduced from "well over 10,000" to "2,500" in 2002. The most widely distributed species Terrapene carolina is classified as vulnerable, while Terrapene ornata is in a lower category as near threatened. For Terrapene nelsoni insufficient information is available for classification.

The Eastern box turtle, Terrapene carolina carolina has been declining due to anthropogenic factors and disease. Studies have documented reports of polymicrobial necrotizing bacterial infection. In Illinois, over 50 box turtles were found dead and this infection was determined to be the cause. Ranavirus may also negatively impact Eastern box turtle population. Continued investigation of Box turtle disease is important to conservation efforts.

Sniffer dogs have been trained to find and track box turtles as part of conservation efforts.

=== Box turtles as pets ===
Most turtle and tortoise societies recommend against box turtles as pets for small children. Box turtles are easily stressed by over-handling and require more care than is generally thought. Box turtles get stressed when moved into new surroundings. Some box turtles will wander aimlessly until they die trying to find their original home if they are removed from the exact area that they grew up in. Three-toed box turtles are often considered the best ones to keep as pets since they are hardy and seem to suffer less from being moved into a new environment.

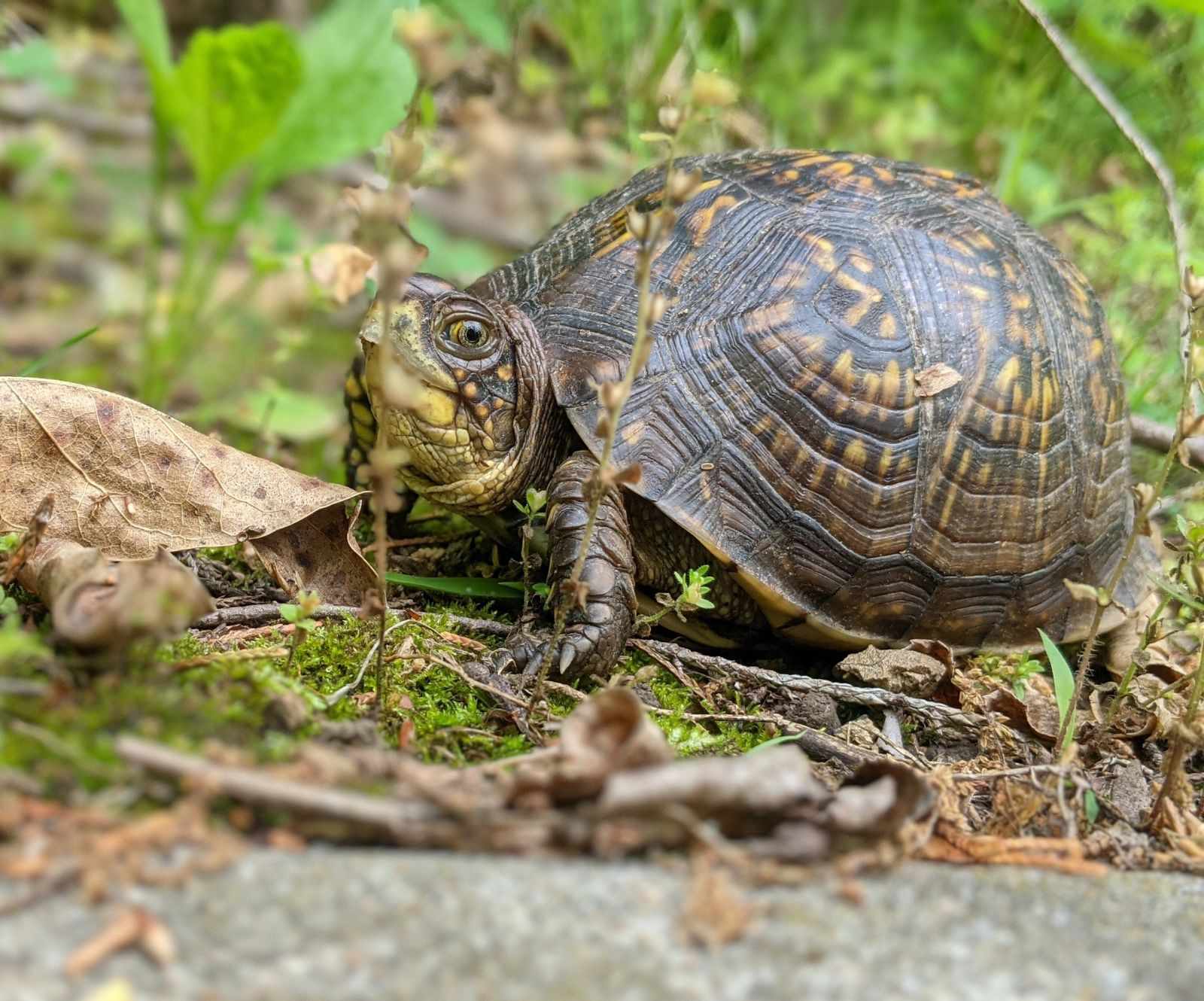
A box turtle in Missouri.

Box turtles can be injured by dogs and cats, so special care must be taken to protect them from household pets. Box turtles require an outdoor enclosure (although they can have indoor enclosures when necessary), consistent exposure to light and a varied diet. Without these, a turtle's growth can be stunted and its immune system weakened.

It is recommended to buy captive-bred box turtles (in areas where this is allowed) to reduce the pressure put on the wild populations. A 3-year study in Texas indicated that over 7,000 box turtles were taken from the wild for commercial trade. A similar study in Louisiana found that in a 41-month period, nearly 30,000 box turtles were taken from the wild for resale, many for export to Europe. Once captured, turtles are often kept in poor conditions where up to half of them die. Those living long enough to be sold may suffer from conditions such as malnutrition, dehydration, and infection.

Indiana, Tennessee, and other states prohibit collecting wild turtles, and many states require a permit to keep them. Breeding is prohibited in some states for fear of its possible detrimental effects upon wild populations.

Collecting box turtles from the wild may damage their populations, as these turtles have a low reproduction rate.

=== State reptiles ===
"The turtle watches undisturbed as countless generations of faster 'hares' run by to quick oblivion, and is thus a model of patience for mankind, and a symbol of our State's unrelenting pursuit of great and lofty goals."

— North Carolina Secretary of State

Box turtles are official state reptiles of five U.S. states. North Carolina and Tennessee honor the eastern box turtle. Missouri names the three-toed box turtle. Kansas and Nebraska honor the ornate box turtle.

In Pennsylvania, the eastern box turtle made it through one house of the legislature, but failed to win final naming in 2009. In Virginia, bills to honor the eastern box turtle failed in 1999 and then in 2009. In opposition one legislator had asked why Virginia would make an official emblem of an animal that retreats into its shell when frightened. What may have mattered most in Virginia, though, was the creature's close link to neighbor state North Carolina.

== Photos ==
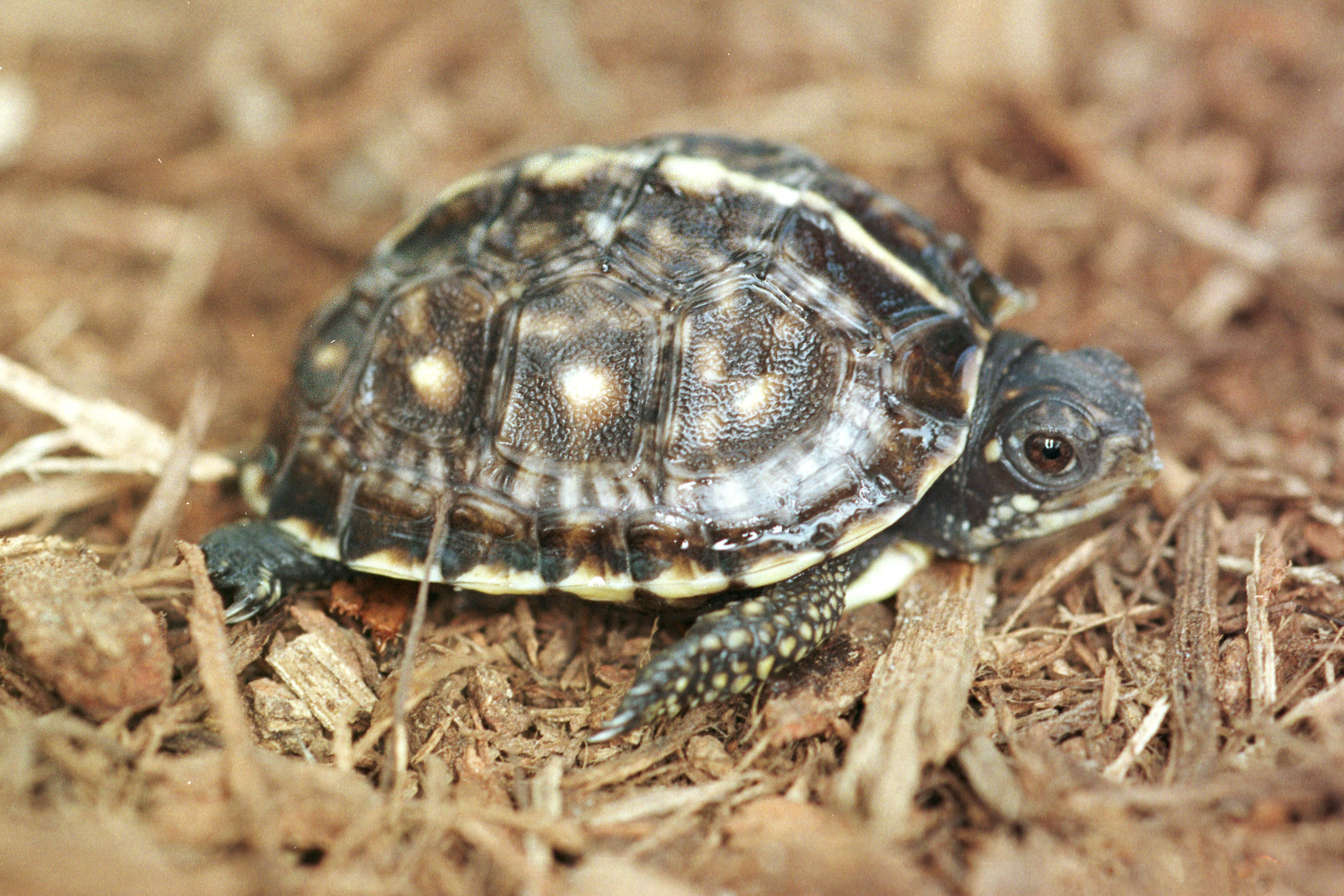
Terrapene carolina carolina (young)

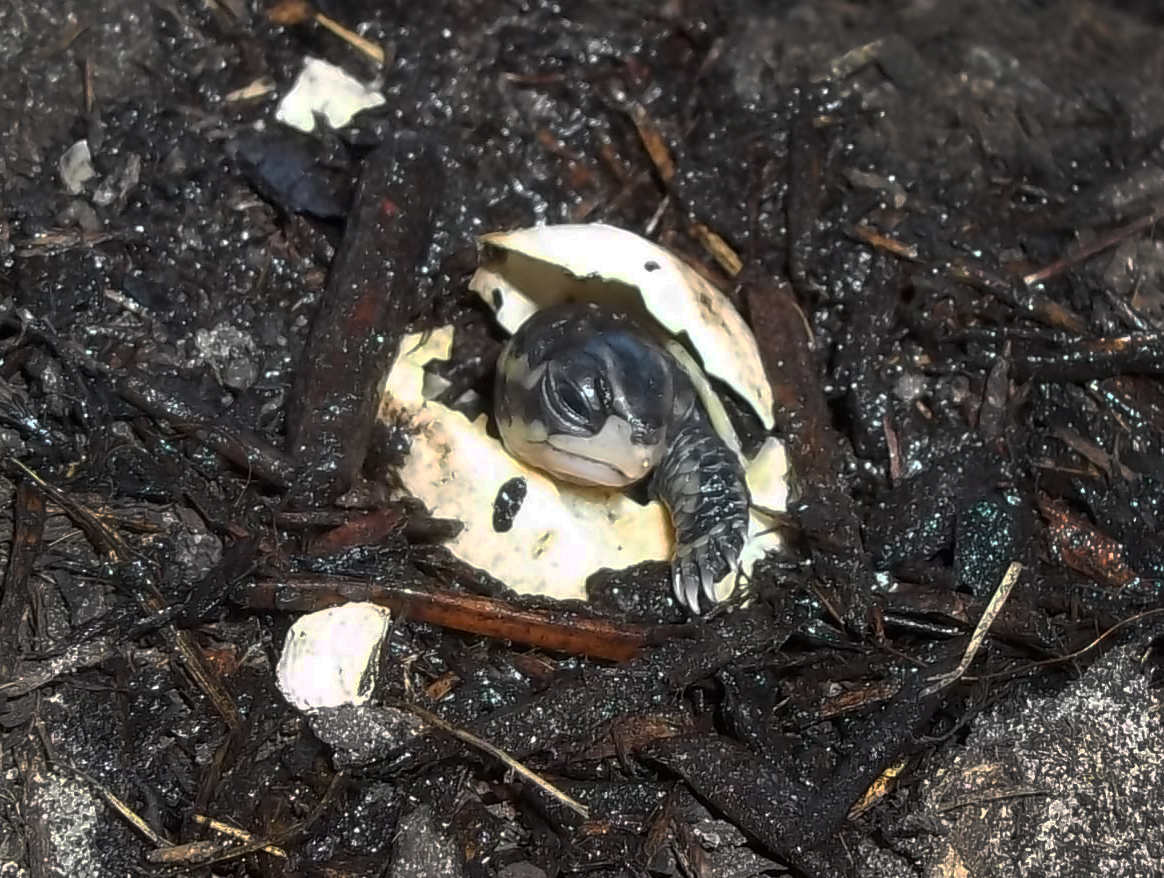
T. c. bauri hatchling

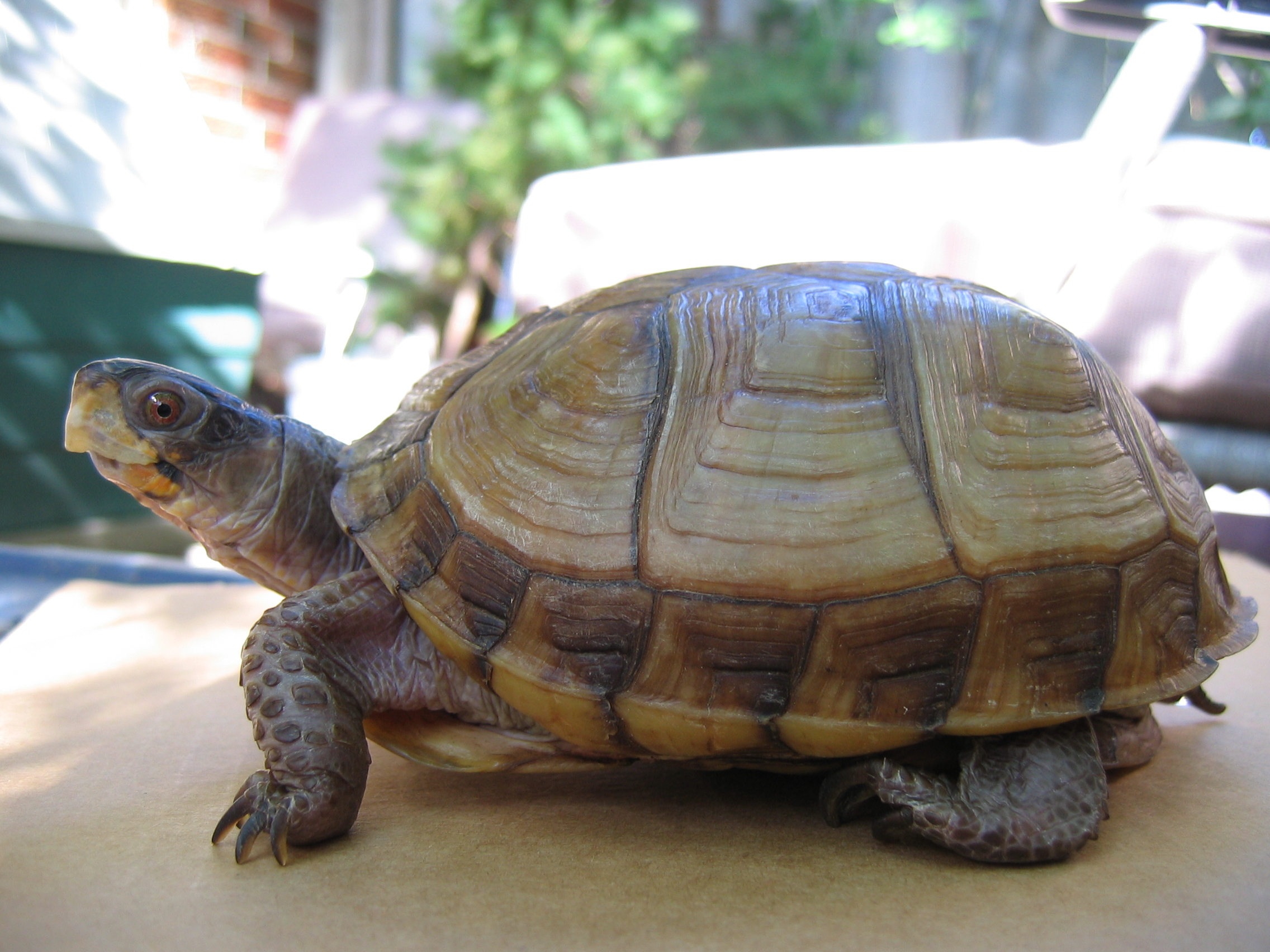
Rings on the scutes of T. triunguis. Rings can be used to estimate the age of box turtles in their early years.

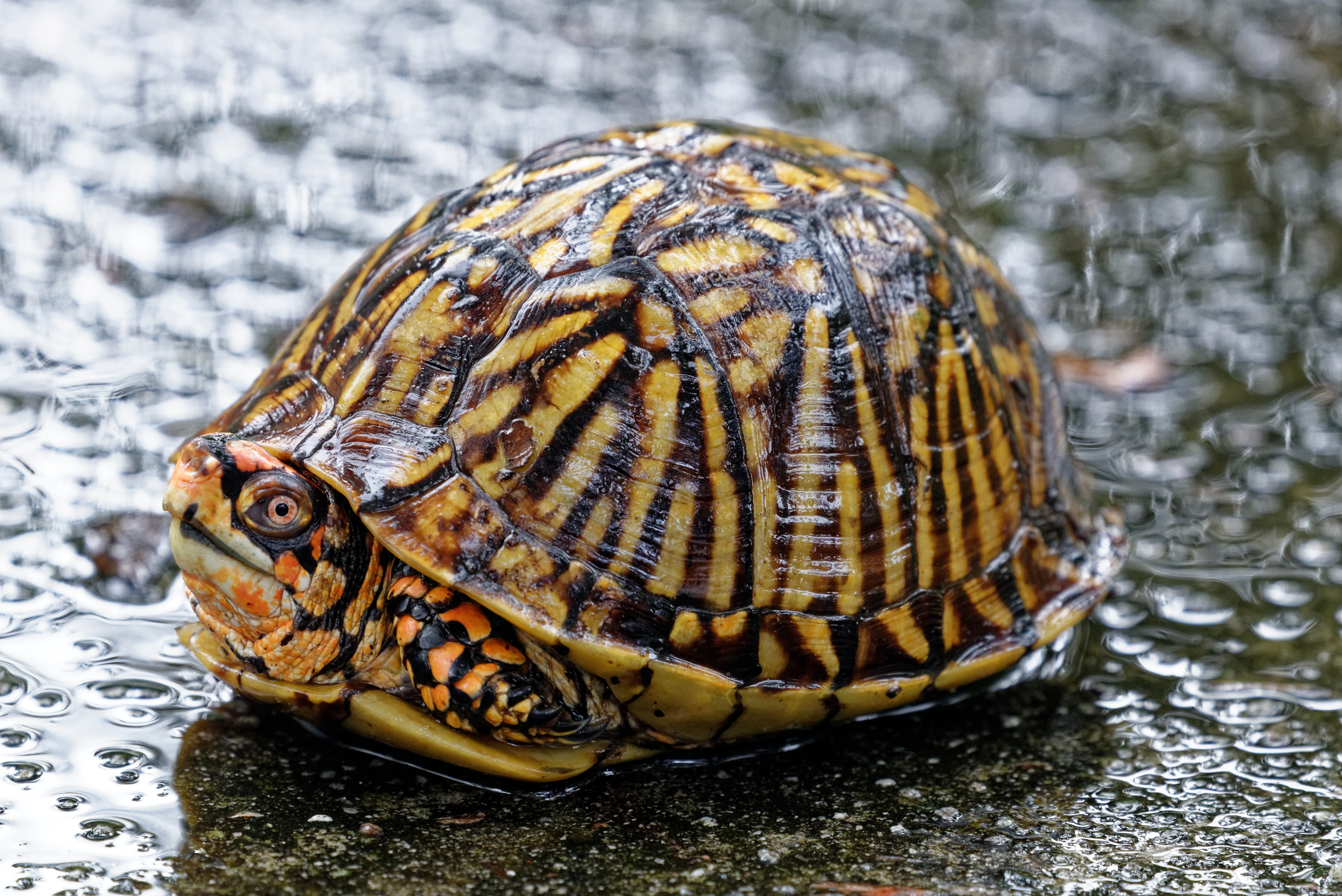
Florida box turtle in southeast Georgia

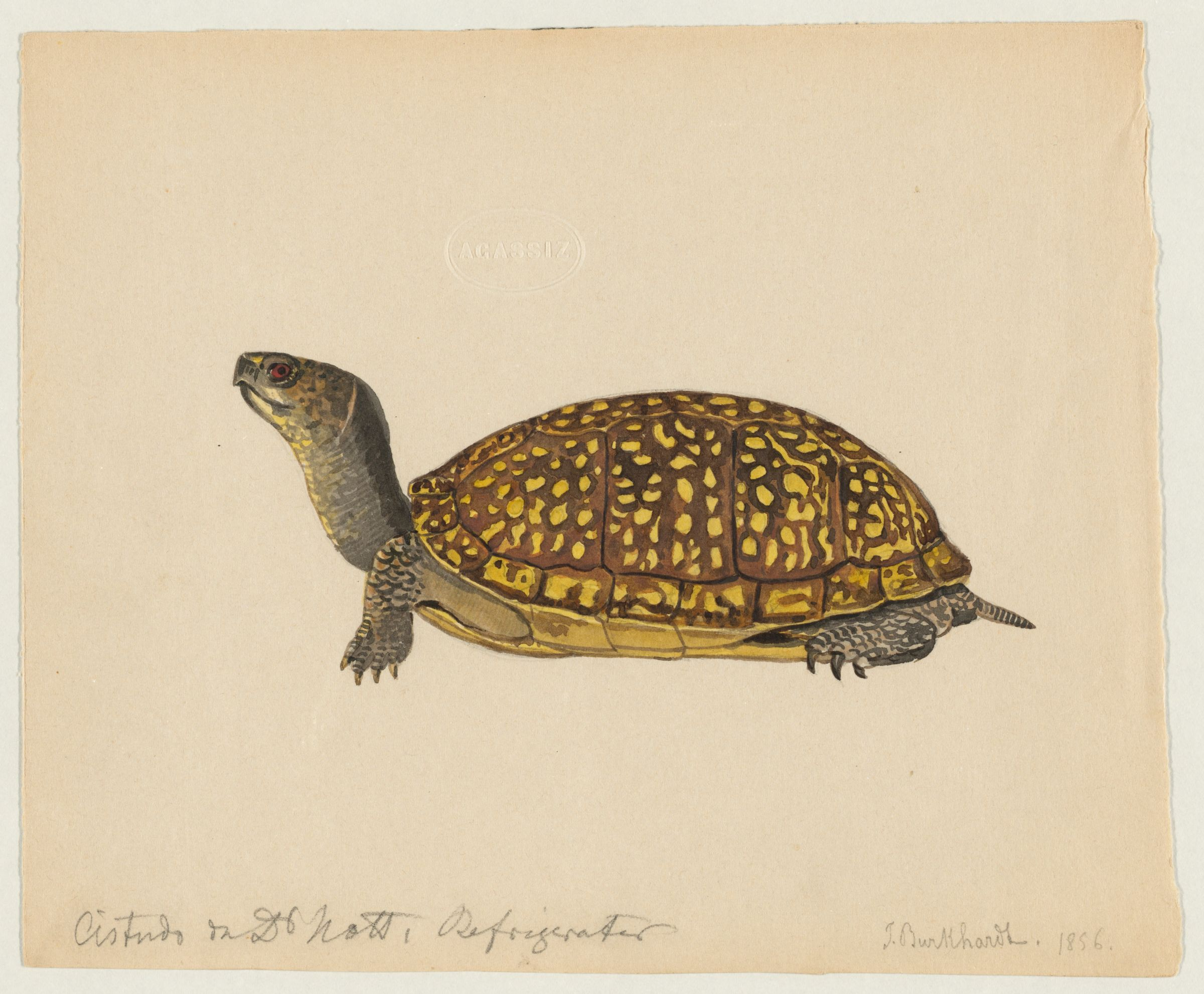
1856 watercolor of a box turtle by Jacques Burkhardt.

== See also ==
- Asian box turtle
