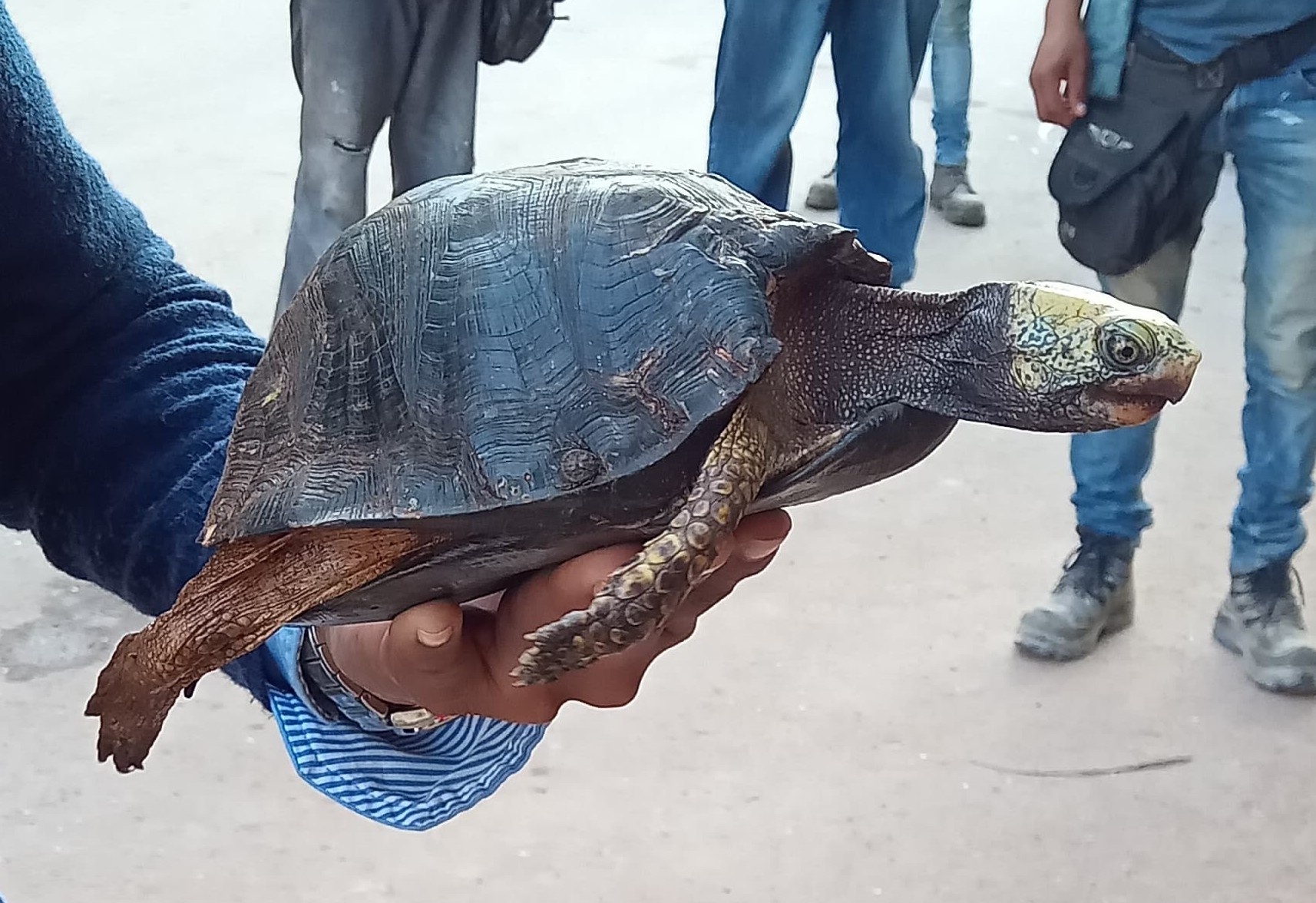

Conservation status
- CITES Appendix II

Scientific classification
- Kingdom: Animalia
- Phylum: Chordata
- Class: Reptilia
- Order: Testudines
- Suborder: Cryptodira
- Family: Emydidae
- Genus: Terrapene
- Species: T. yucatana

Binomial name
- Terrapene yucatana (Boulenger, 1895)

Synonyms
- Cistudo yucatana Boulenger, 1895; Terrapene yucatana – Siebenrock, 1909; Terrapene mexicana yucatana – H.M. Smith, 1939; Terrapene carolina yucatana – Milstead, 1967; Terapene mexicana jucatana Nietzke, 1973 (ex errore)

= Yucatán box turtle =

Species of turtle

The Yucatán box turtle (Terrapene yucatana) is a species of box turtle endemic to Mexico. It is sometimes treated as a subspecies of Terrapene carolina.

== Geographic range ==
It is found in the Mexican state of Yucatán.

== Description ==
Its shell is light-colored with some star-shaped dark spots. Its head is also light-colored. It has four toes on each foot.

== Gallery ==
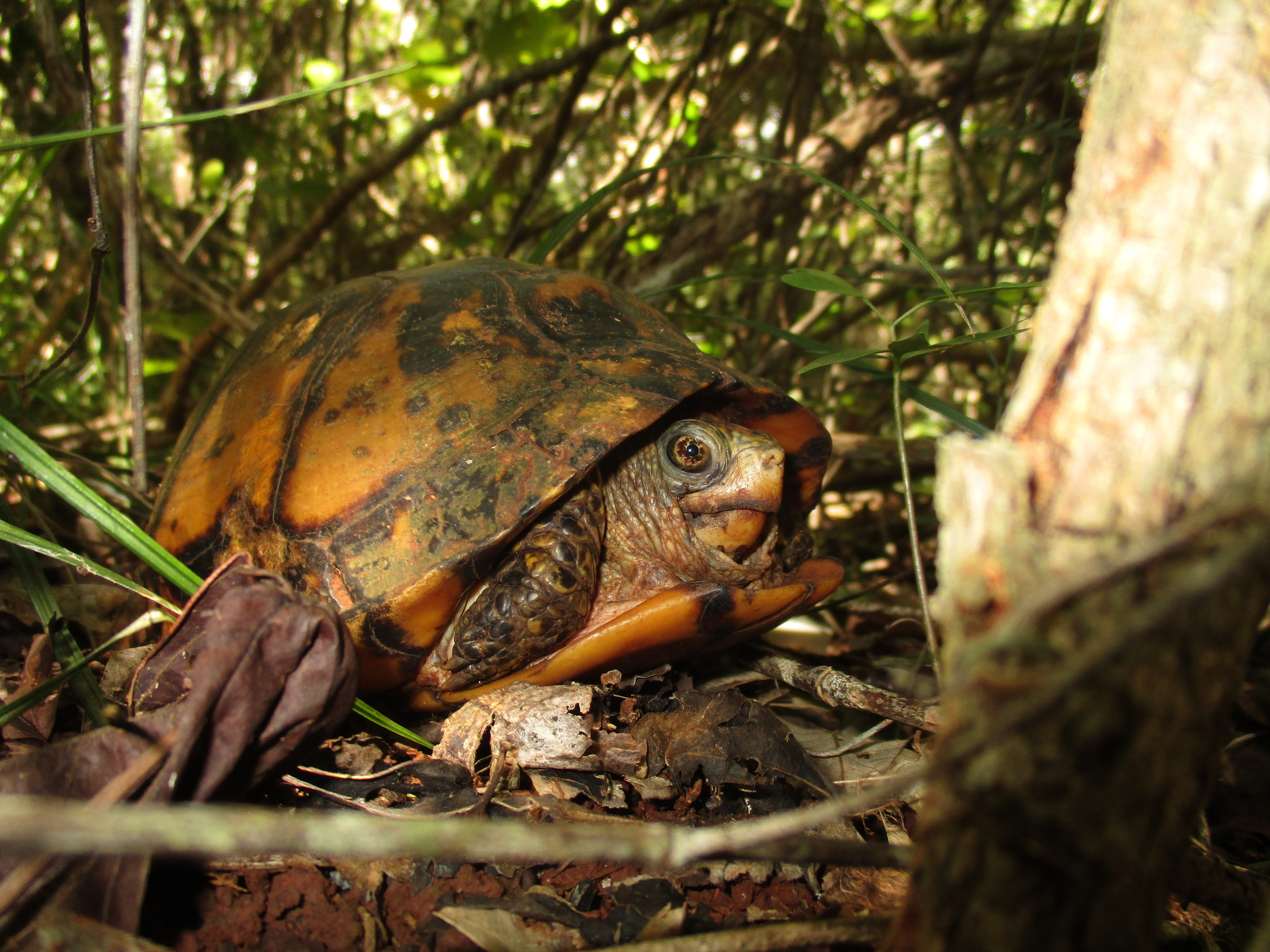

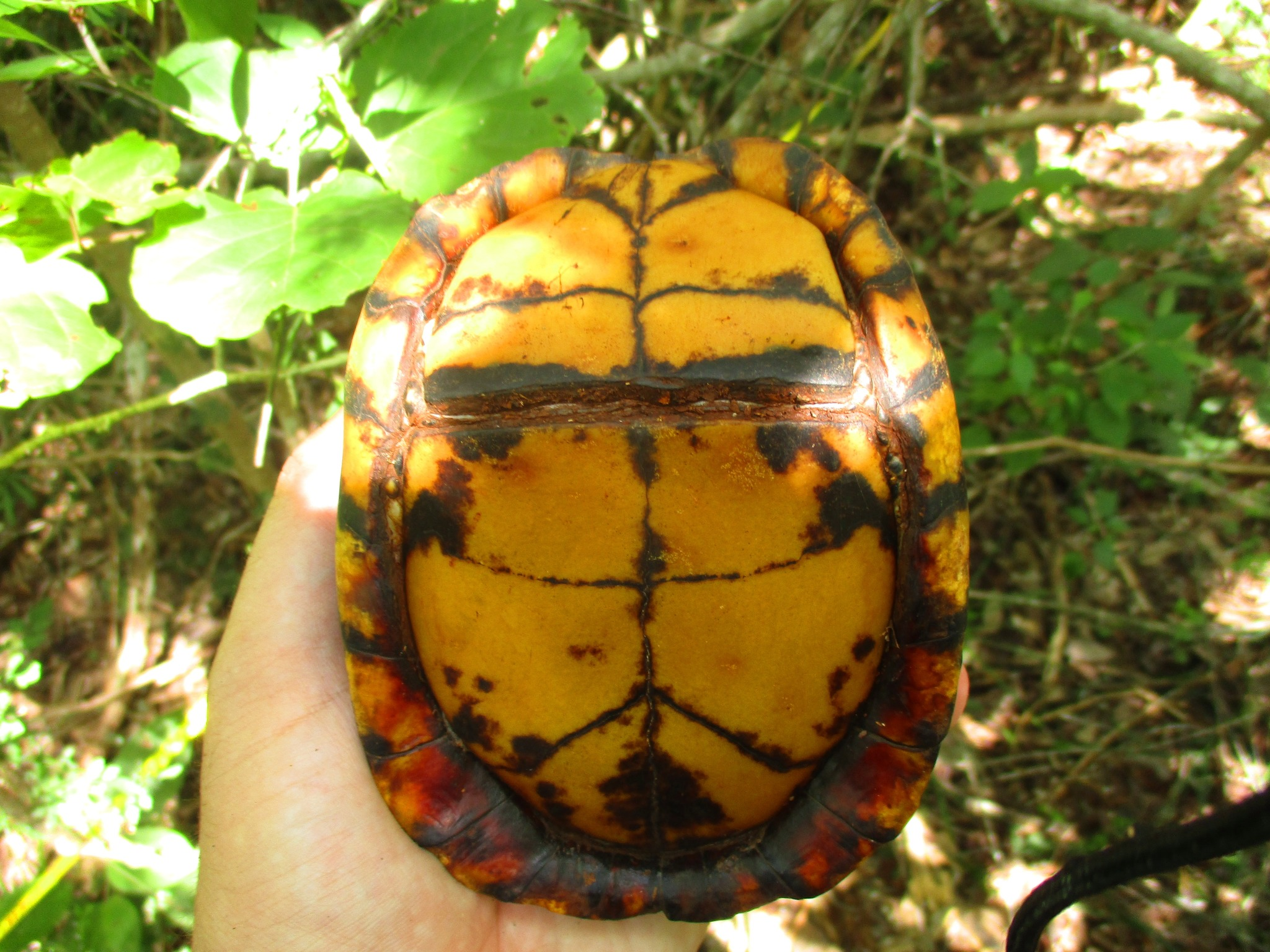

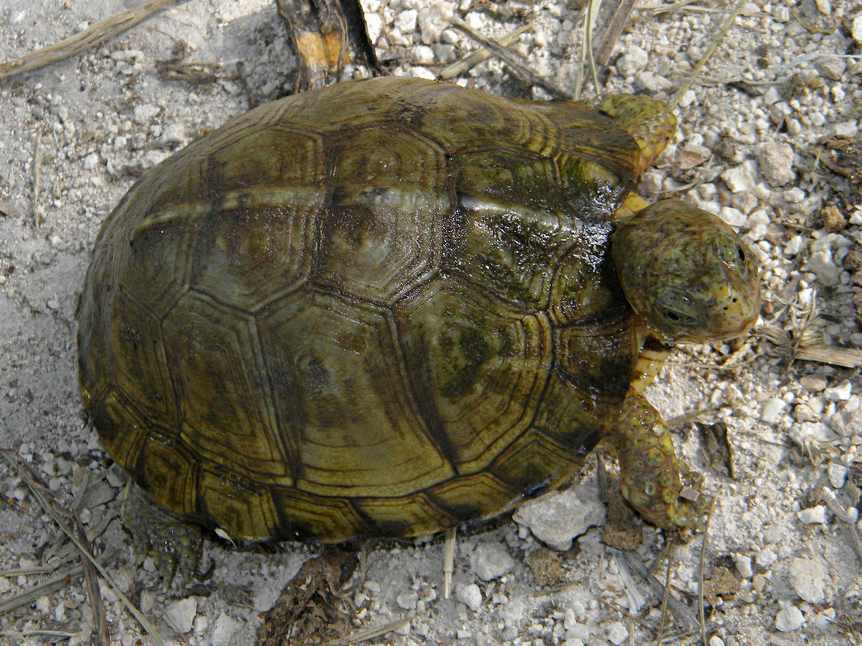
