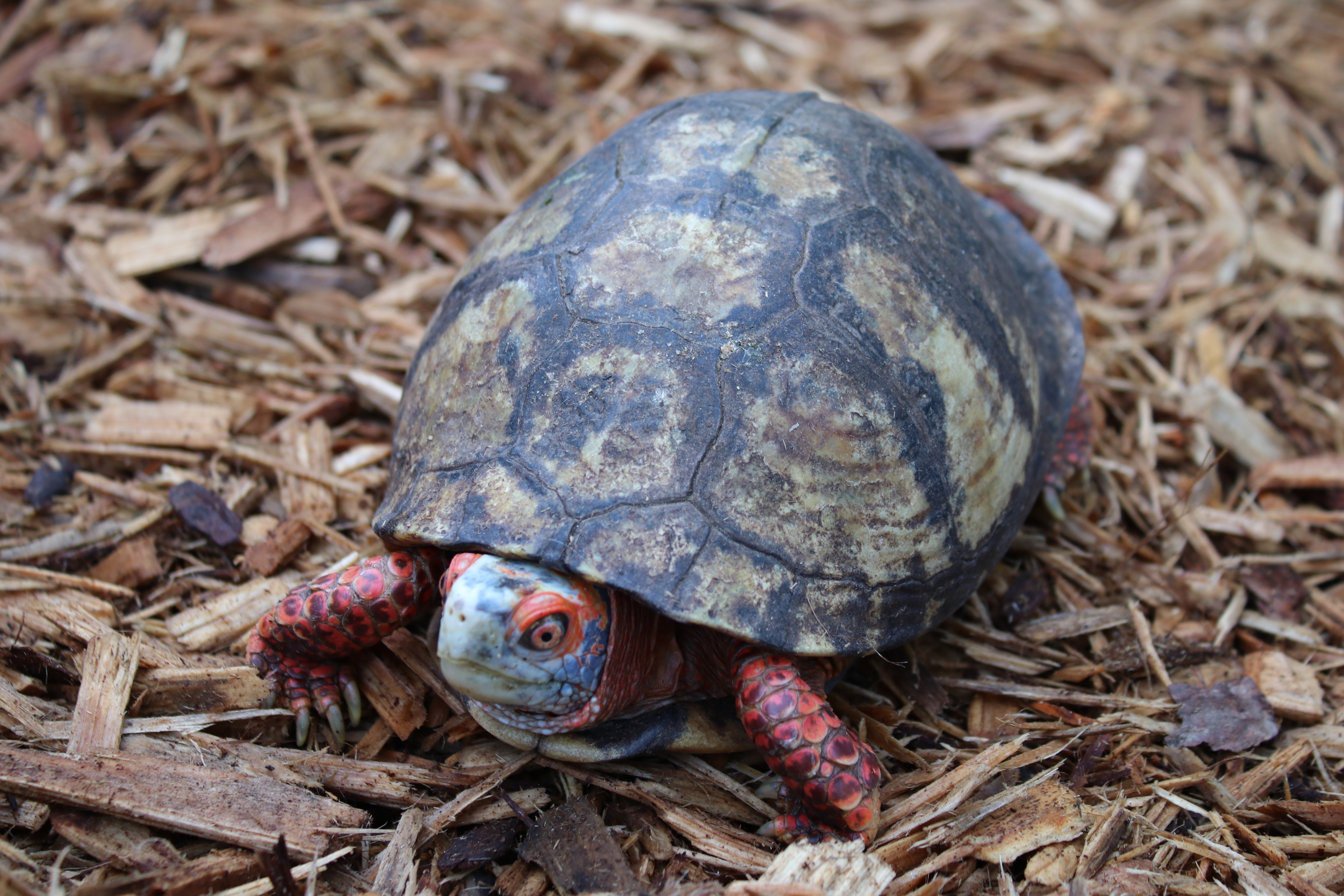
- Terrapene mexicana

Conservation status
- CITES Appendix II (CITES)

Scientific classification
- Domain: Eukaryota
- Kingdom: Animalia
- Phylum: Chordata
- Class: Reptilia
- Order: Testudines
- Suborder: Cryptodira
- Superfamily: Testudinoidea
- Family: Emydidae
- Genus: Terrapene
- Species: T. mexicana

Binomial name
- Terrapene mexicana (Gray, 1849)

Synonyms
- List: Cistudo (Onychotria) mexicana Gray, 1849; Onychotria mexicana LeConte, 1854; Cistudo carolina var. mexicana Boulenger, 1889; Onichotria mexicana Herrera, 1890; Chelopus mexicanus Velasco, 1892; Terrapene mexicana Baur, 1893; Terrapene goldmani Stejneger, 1933; Terrapene mexicana mexicana H. M. Smith & Taylor, 1950; Terrapene carolina mexicana Milstead, 1967; Terapene mexicana mexicana Nietzke, 1973

= Mexican box turtle =

Species of turtle

The Mexican box turtle (Terrapene mexicana) is a species of box turtle belonging to the family Emydidae. It is sometimes treated as a subspecies of Terrapene carolina (Terrapene carolina mexicana).

== Geographic range ==
This species is endemic to Mexico. It is found in the Mexican states of Tamaulipas, Veracruz and San Luis Potosí.

== Habitat ==
It lives in areas with tropical climates within humid forests at shallow rainwater puddles.

== Description ==
Terrapene mexicana can reach a length of about 18–20 cm (7.1–7.9 in). The carapace is long and dome-shaped, with rather variable color and markings. The adult males show gray-blue nuances on the head and red or orange nuances on the front legs.

== Biology ==
The Mexican box turtle does not have much information on them because very few of them are domesticated (kept as pets). However, we do know that they have a lifespan of 100 years. Usually these turtles have water nearby homes and a bush to hide. Having a home by the water will attract insects, which are a big part of their diet.

== Gallery ==
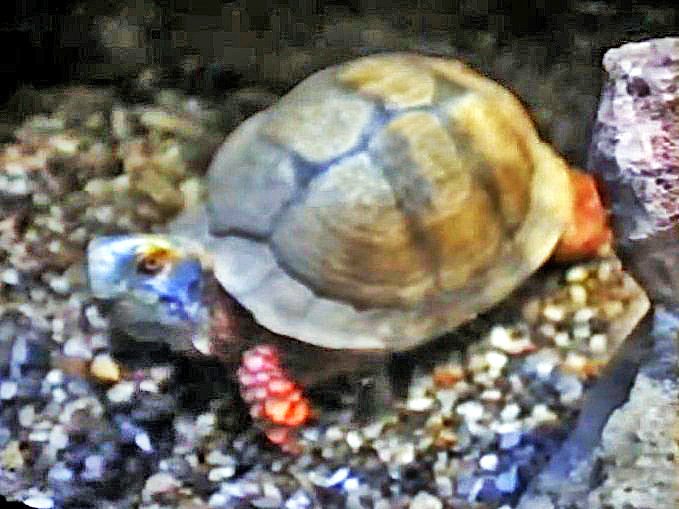
Terrapene mexicana at the Zoo Atlanta

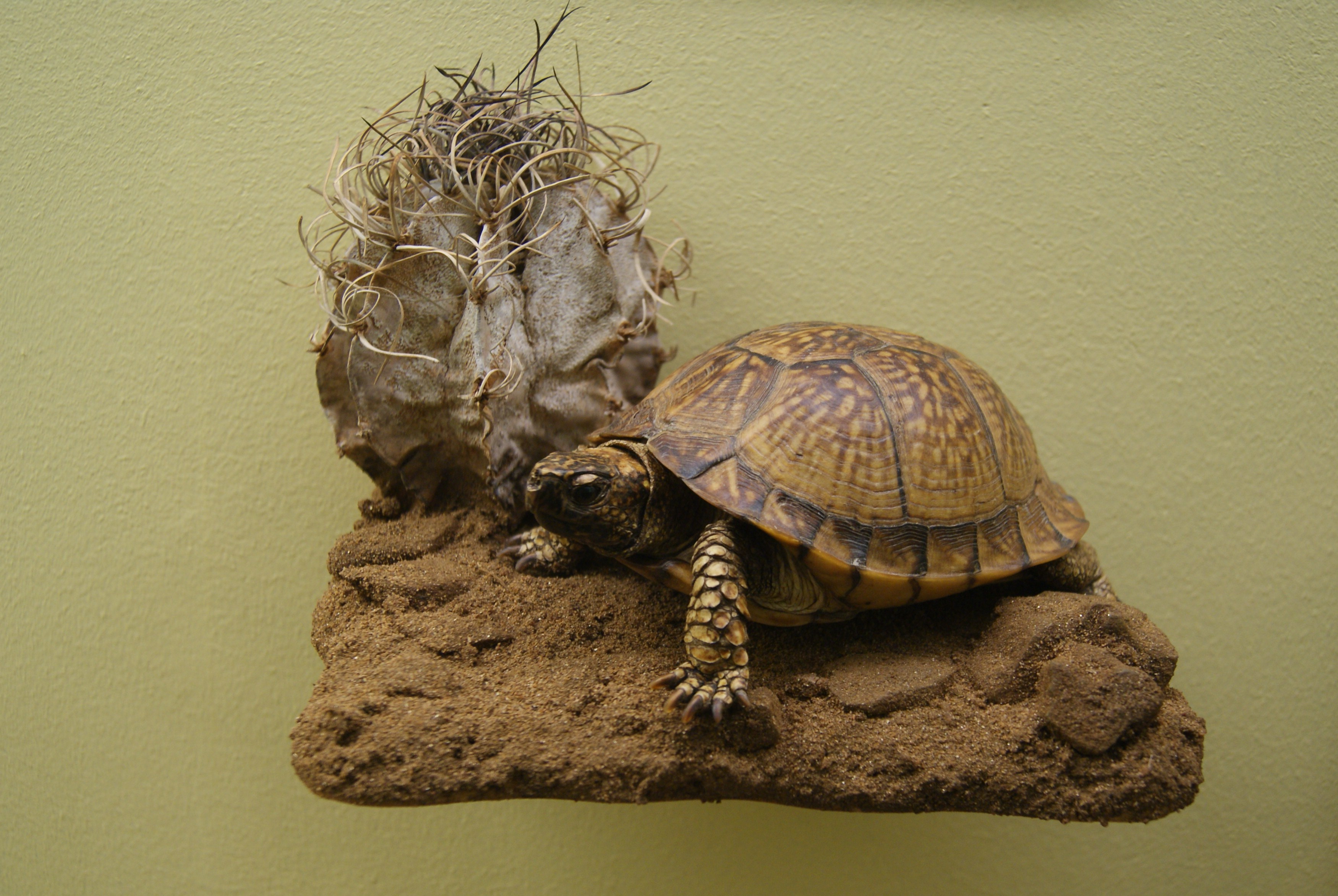
A Mexican box turtle on display in Gothenburg Natural History Museum

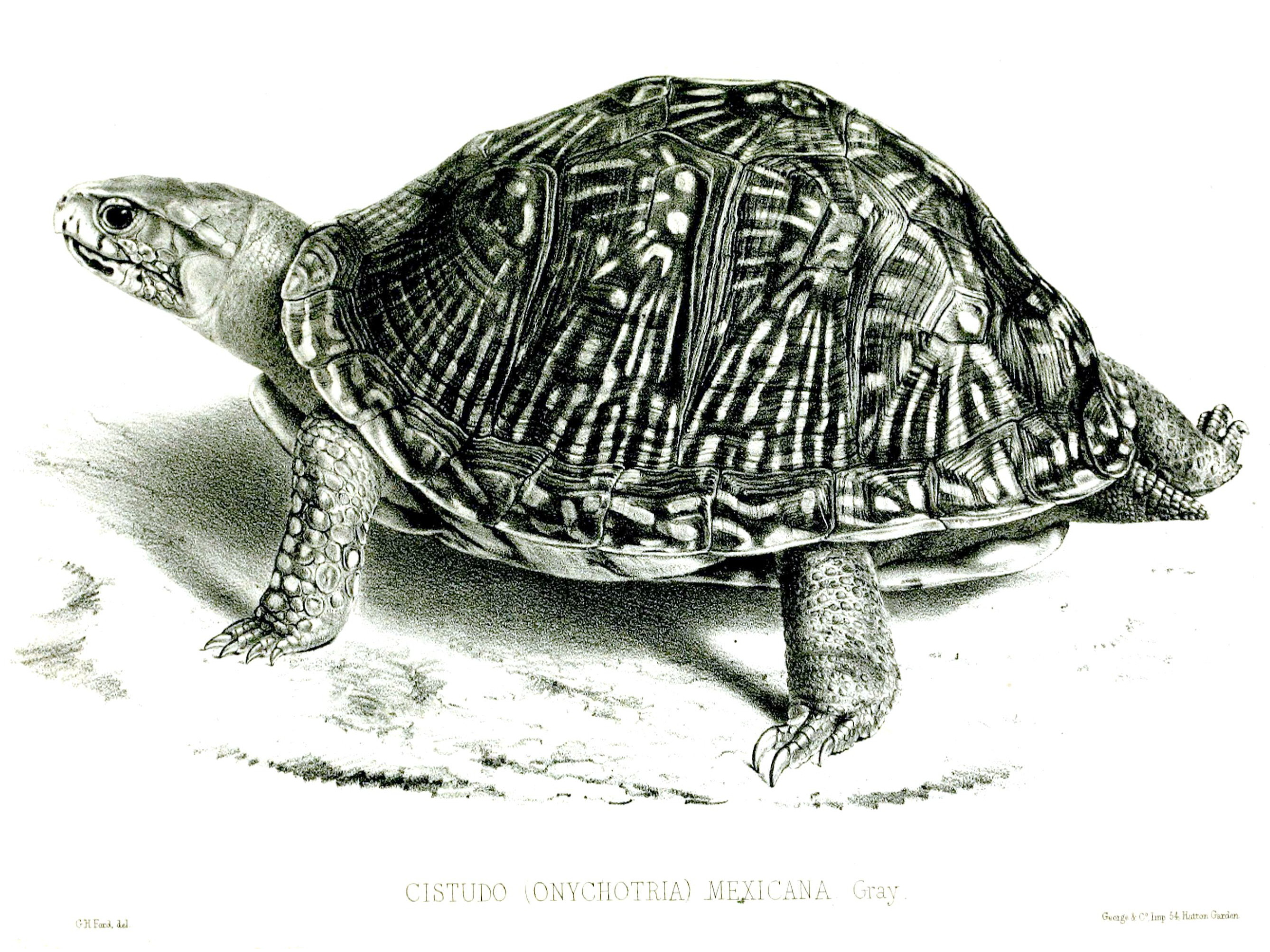
Illustration from Proceedings of the Zoological Society of London 1848-1849

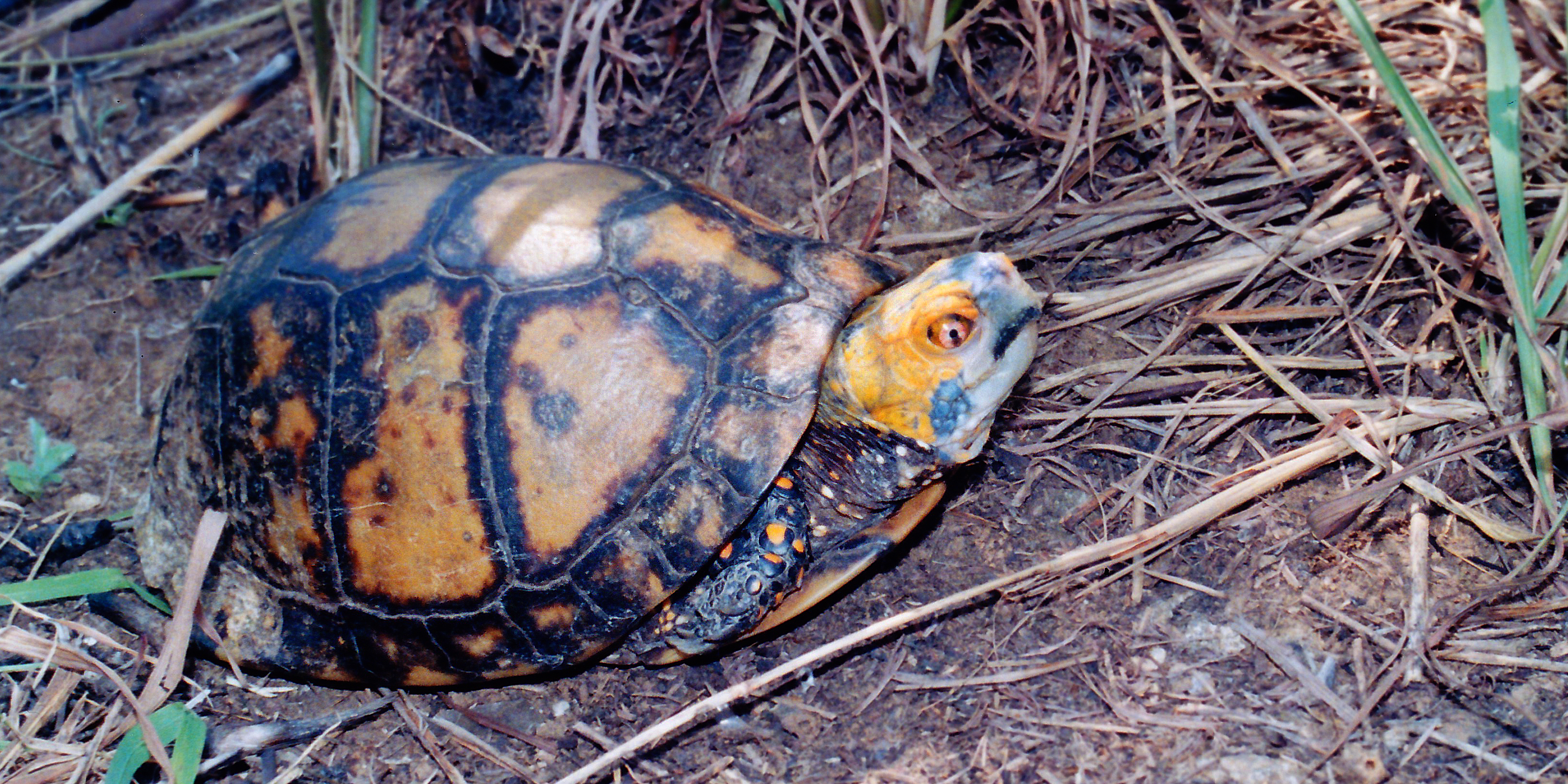
Mexican box turtle (Terrapene mexicana) in the field in southern Tamaulipas, Mexico

Bibliography

- Rhodin, Anders G.J.; van Dijk, Peter Paul; Inverson, John B.; Shaffer, H. Bradley; Roger, Bour (2011-12-31). "Turtles of the world, 2011 update: Annotated checklist of taxonomy, synonymy, distribution and conservation status". Chelonian Research Monographs. 5.
- Fritz, Uwe; Havaš, Peter (2007). "Checklist of Chelonians of the World". Vertebrate Zoology. 57
- Dodd, C. Kenneth. North American Box Turtles a Natural History. University of Oklahoma Press, 2002.
- Milstead, William W., and Donald W. Tinkle. "Terrapene of Western Mexico, with Comments on the Species Groups in the Genus". Copeia, vol. 1967, no. 1, 1967, p. 180., doi:10.2307/1442193
- Stone, Lynn M. Nature Watch: Box Turtles. Lynn M. Stone, 2007.
