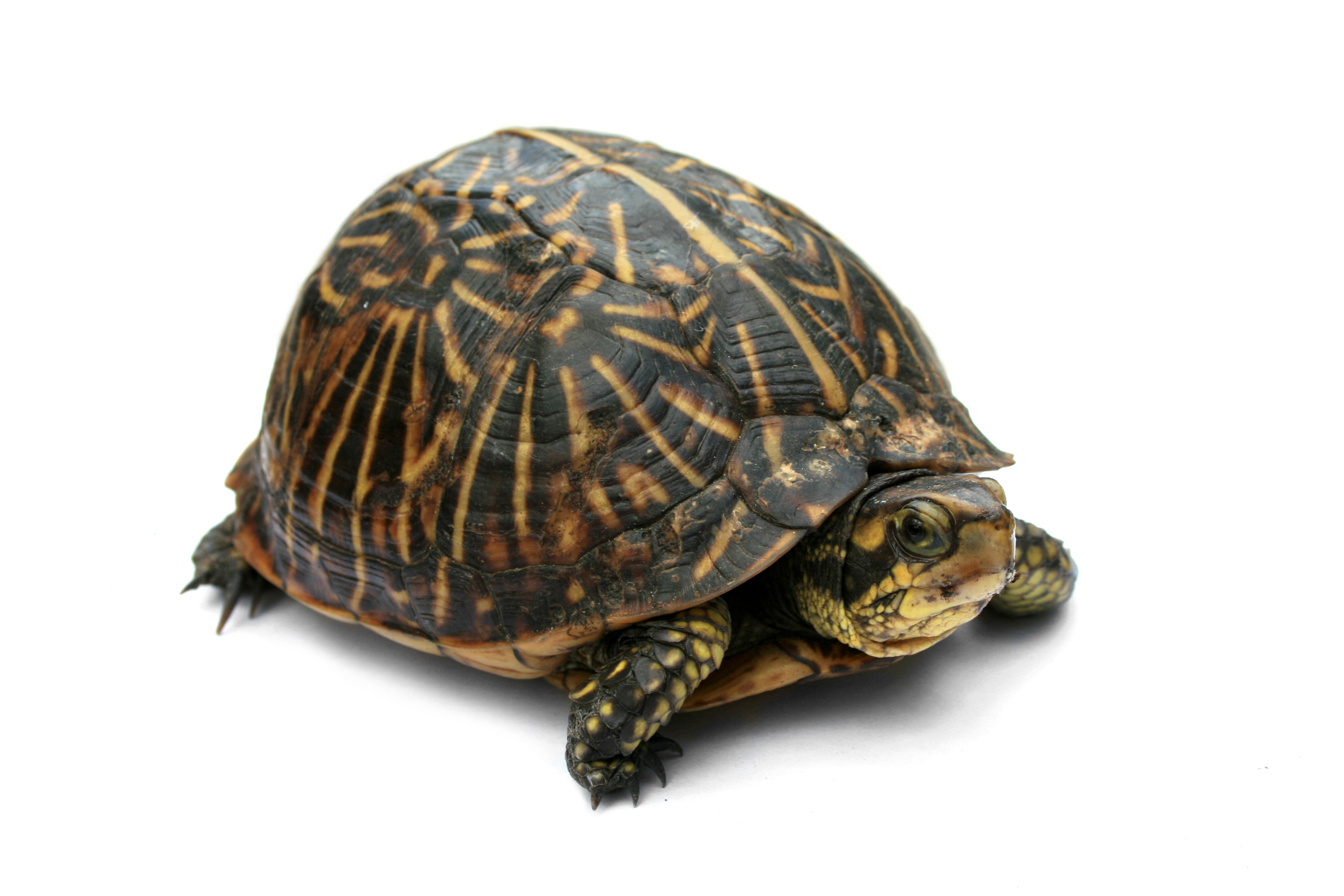
- Terrapene carolina bauri

Conservation status
- CITES Appendix II

Scientific classification
- Kingdom: Animalia
- Phylum: Chordata
- Class: Reptilia
- Order: Testudines
- Suborder: Cryptodira
- Family: Emydidae
- Genus: Terrapene
- Species: T. carolina
- Subspecies: T. c. bauri

Trinomial name
- Terrapene carolina bauri Taylor, 1895

Synonyms
- Terrapene bauri Taylor, 1895; Pariemys bauri — Cope, 1895; Cistudo bauri — Ditmars, 1907; Terrapene innoxia Hay, 1916; Terrapene carolina bauri — Carr, 1940; Terrapene carolina baurii Stubbs, 1989 (ex errore)

= Florida box turtle =

Subspecies of turtle

The Florida box turtle (Terrapene carolina bauri) is a subspecies of turtle belonging to the family Emydidae and is one of six extant subspecies of the common box turtle (T. carolina)

== Etymology ==
The subspecific name, bauri, is in honor of German herpetologist Georg Baur.

== Geographic range ==
Of the four subspecies of the common box turtle, the Florida box turtle has the southernmost range. It is endemic to the U.S. state of Florida and the extreme southeastern portion of Georgia. Its distribution is widespread throughout Florida's mainland and has also been observed in the Florida Keys and the barrier islands in the Gulf of Mexico off of Florida's western coast.

== Habitat ==
The Florida box turtle can be found in damp environments such as wetlands, marshlands, and near swamps but usually does not enter water deep enough to swim. It is often found in the flatwoods, upland, and mesophytic hammock but is generally absent in the high pine. Within these habitats, juveniles prefer areas that contain dense cover, high amounts of leaf litter, and moist soil. Adults are more flexible in their habitat requirements and have been observed in more open areas.

=== Temperature ===
- Daytime air temperature: 70–90 °F (21–32 °C)
- Basking temperature: 85–95 °F (29–35 °C)
- Humidity: 70 - 90%

== Description ==
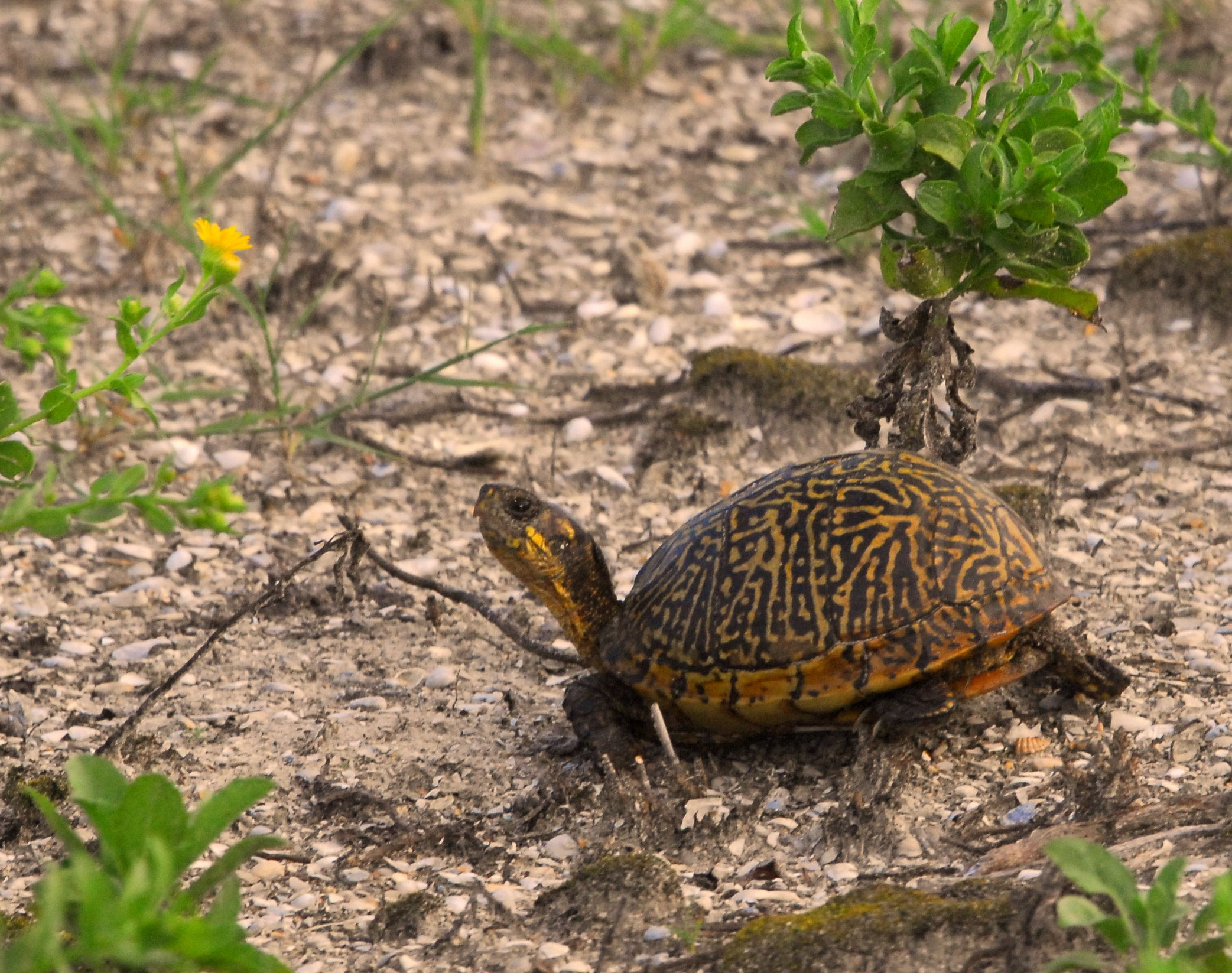
Florida box turtle (Terrapene carolina bauri)

Like other box turtles, the Florida box turtle has a narrow and highly domed shell with a hinged plastron that allows it to close its shell tightly. However, the Florida box turtle is different in appearance from the other subspecies of Terrapene carolina. Its carapace has a distinct pattern of yellow stripes that make it easily identifiable. The coloring of the plastron can vary anywhere from solid yellow to solid black, with any number of variations in between. This turtle has sharp claws as well as a sharp beak used for catching small insects and eating fruits, vegetables, and fungi.

The Florida box turtle exhibits significant sexual dimorphism. On average, males are larger (length and width) than females. The carapace length of females ranges from 12.1 - 15.8 cm while the average male carapace can be anywhere from 12.8 - 17.3 cm long. However, female carapaces tend to be taller than those of males. This is most likely to allow more space to accommodate eggs inside the body cavity.

== Behavior ==
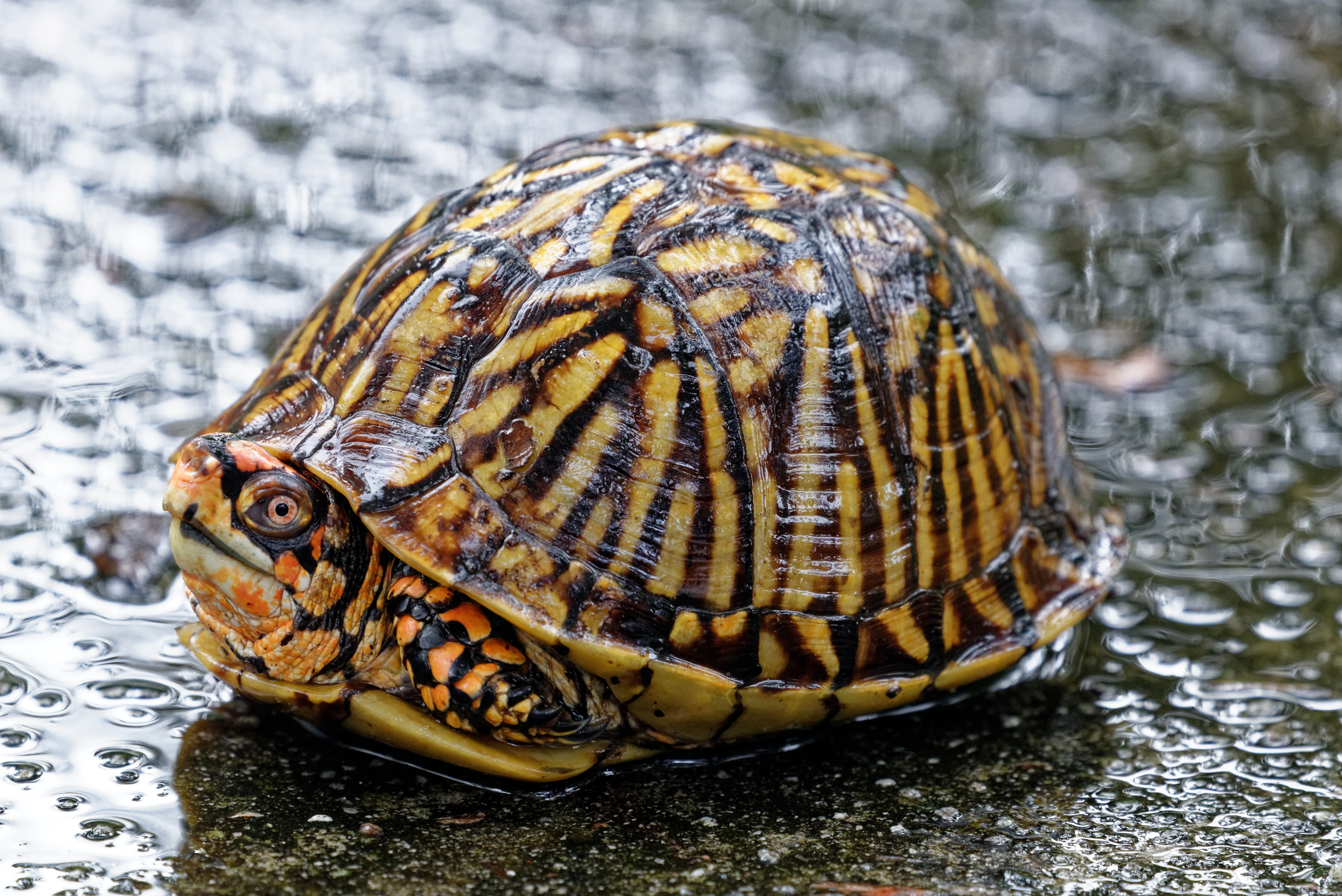
Box turtle in southeast Georgia

Like many other box turtle species, the Florida box turtle spends an extreme majority of its life (80-90%) buried in the underbrush or underground, and their activity varies significantly at different times of the year. During the dry, cool parts of the year (November - February) they enter a dormant stage and are inactive and difficult to find. They exhibit higher levels of activity during the warm, wet months (April - October). However, unlike other species of box turtle, the Florida box turtle does not actually enter a complete state of brumation during this time of year. This is most likely due to the warm and stable temperatures throughout its Florida range. As a result, it exhibits longer annual activity than other box turtle species. It is less tolerant to colder conditions than other common box turtle subspecies.

=== Feeding ===
The Florida box turtle is a generalist omnivore with a diet similar to other box turtle subspecies. Its most common food sources include gastropod species and fleshy, low-hanging fruits. They also consume leafy vegetation (shrubs, herb, grasses, etc.), insects, crustaceans, and fungi. They have even been observed feeding on carrion and garbage.

=== Seed dispersal ===
The Florida box turtle contributes to the seed dispersal of various plants throughout its range. The vast majority of these plants contain fruit (Annona glabra, Brysonima lucida, Coccoloba uvifera, Cocothrinax argentata, Ficus sp., Morinda royoc, Manilkara zapoda, Psidium longipes, Serenoa repens, Smilax havenensis, Thrinax morrissii) while others might not (Paspalum spp., Fabaceae).

== Reproduction and life cycle ==
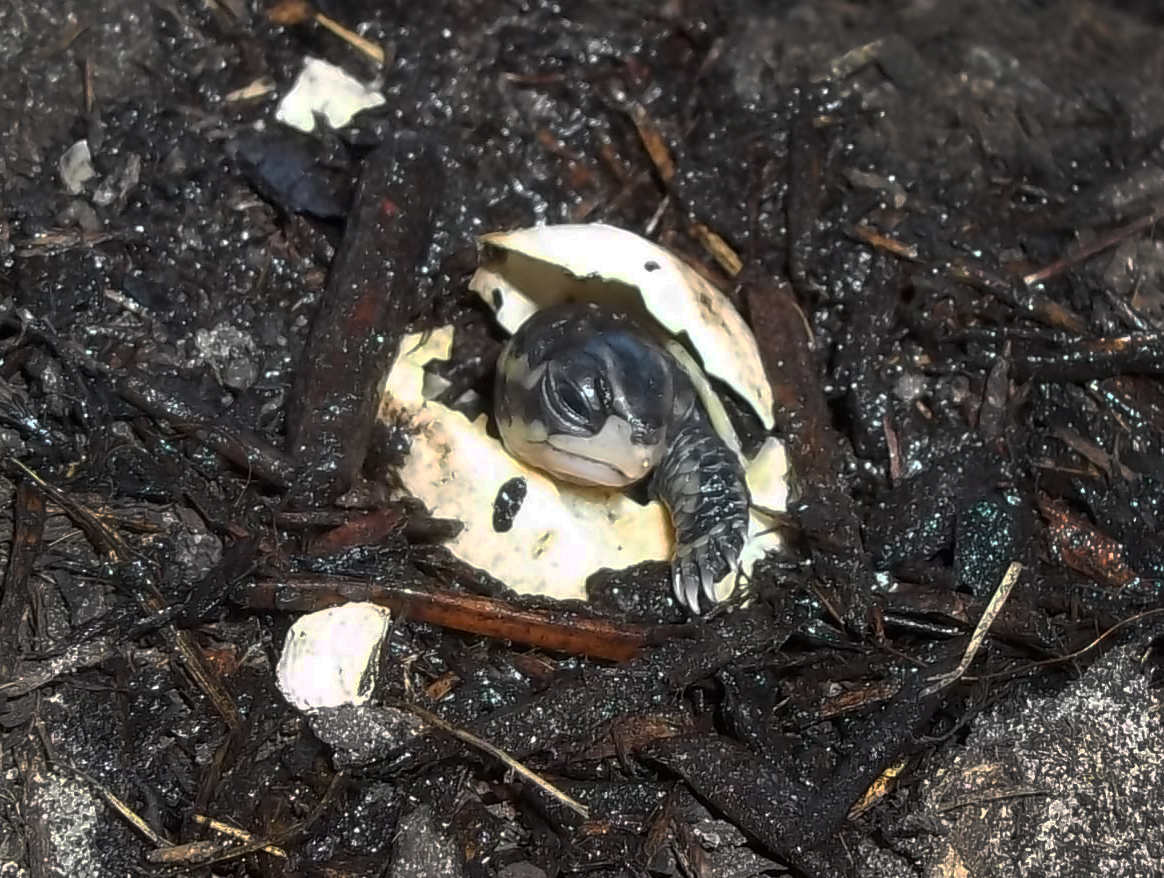
T. c. bauri hatchling

The Florida box turtle reaches sexual maturity around 12–13 years of age. While some species can produce only one clutch in a breeding season, the Florida box turtle has been observed laying as many as four separate clutches in a single year. The egg laying season occurs in the Spring and generally lasts from April to early June. On average, each clutch can contain 1 - 9 eggs that range in size from 35×19 mm to 38.5×21 mm. Its eggs tend to be slightly larger than those of other T. carolina subspecies. Researchers have observed a positive relationship between female carapace length and clutch size, with larger females possessing the ability to produce more eggs. Incubation of the eggs lasts an average of 60 days but can last anywhere from 45 – 120 days. Different environmental factors may influence the reproductive success of the Florida box turtle. Years with higher levels of precipitation may positively influence reproductive success, resulting in a higher number of hatchlings when compared with drier years. Research also points toward a positive correlation between latitude and clutch size in box turtles, with larger clutch sizes being found in higher latitudes. The incubation temperature of a clutch has been observed to influence the sex ratio of the hatchlings. Warm incubation temperatures tend to produce more females, while cooler temperatures result in more males.

Its growth patterns are similar to other species of box turtles. Juvenile turtles have shorter and wider scutes and carapaces when compared to adults, but these lengthen as the individual grows. Growth rates are rapid in juveniles, slow down significantly following sexual maturity, and eventually level off completely a few years later (around 16 and 17 years in females and males respectively). Despite having higher activity levels, the Florida box turtle has a slower annual growth rate than other box turtle species.

== Threats and conservation ==
Like other subspecies of T. carolina, the Florida box turtles is listed on the IUCN red list as a vulnerable species. Wild populations are at risk due to predation of eggs and juveniles (raccoons, possums, foxes, birds), habitat loss and modification, car strikes, pesticides, pollution, and collection for the pet trade and turtle racing.

=== Wildfires ===
Seasonal fire regimes in Florida represent a significant source of mortality for box turtles, with burns having the potential to kill off nearly half of a population. However, the mortality rate of turtles is lower during dry season burns as opposed to wet season burns. This is potentially due to its inactivity and its tendency to spend more time underground during the dry season.

== As pets ==
Florida box turtles can be kept as pets. They are omnivores and feed on a huge variety of food in the wild. In captivity, they are especially fond of live food such as earthworms, crickets, locusts, snails, wax worms (as a treat because of their high fat content), superworms (Zophobas morio), and baby mice. In addition to this large variety of live foods, you can offer chopped fruits and vegetables. Finely grated dark green veggies such as lettuces and kale, and fruits such as melons, berries and cantaloupe are also accepted (though not eagerly) once or twice a week.

By law, in their home state, no person may possess more than two of these turtles. People may be prosecuted by fine and removal of the animals if they own three or more without a reptile permit. This subspecies is found only in Florida, and is also protected in many other areas. Many pet stores offer hatchlings as pets, which are usually healthier than the box turtles from the wild.
