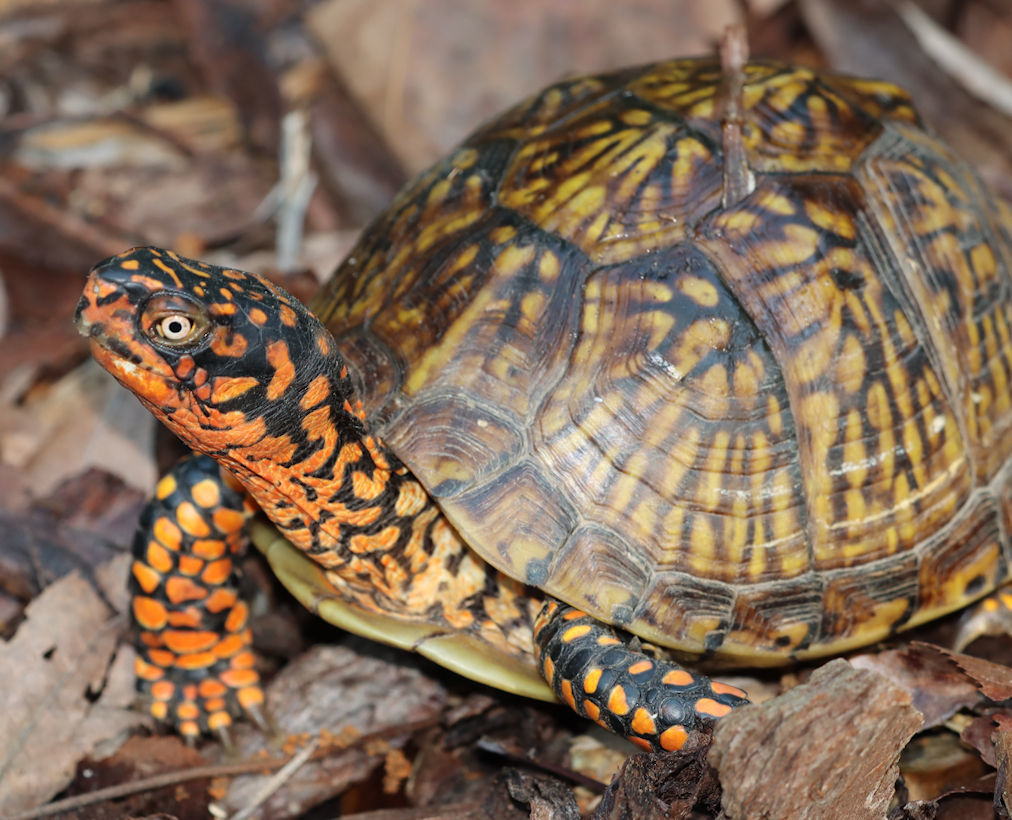
- In Arkansas

Conservation status
- Secure (NatureServe)
- CITES Appendix II

Scientific classification
- Kingdom: Animalia
- Phylum: Chordata
- Class: Reptilia
- Order: Testudines
- Suborder: Cryptodira
- Family: Emydidae
- Genus: Terrapene
- Species: T. triunguis

Binomial name
- Terrapene triunguis (Agassiz, 1857)

Synonyms
- List: Cistudo triunguis Agassiz, 1857; Cistudo carolina var. triunguis — Garman, 1892; Terrapene triunguis — Baur, 1893; Onychotria triunguis — Cope, 1895; Terrapene carolina triunguis — Strecker, 1910; Terrapene whitneyi O.P. Hay, 1916; Terrapene bulverda O.P. Hay, 1920; Terrapene impressa O.P. Hay, 1924; Terrapene llanensis Oelrich, 1953

= Three-toed box turtle =

Species of turtle

The three-toed box turtle (Terrapene triunguis) is a species within the genus of hinge-shelled turtles commonly referred to as box turtles. This species is native to the south-central part of the United States and is the official reptile of the state of Missouri. It is sometimes treated as a subspecies of the eastern box turtle as T. carolina triunguis.

== Distribution and habitat ==
From the west to the east of its range, the three-toed box turtle can be found from eastern Texas to the northern edge of the Florida Panhandle. Its northernmost range is in Missouri and Kansas, while the southernmost one is in Louisiana. Three-toed box turtles interbreed with other subspecies of common box turtles which overlap the borders of this area. An example of this occurs in the eastern Mississippi valley, where this species is difficult to distinguish from the eastern box turtle. Being popular in the pet trade, three-toed box turtles are sometimes found well outside of their home range. It is not known whether such captives when released into the wild have any impact on the local species of such areas.

== Description ==
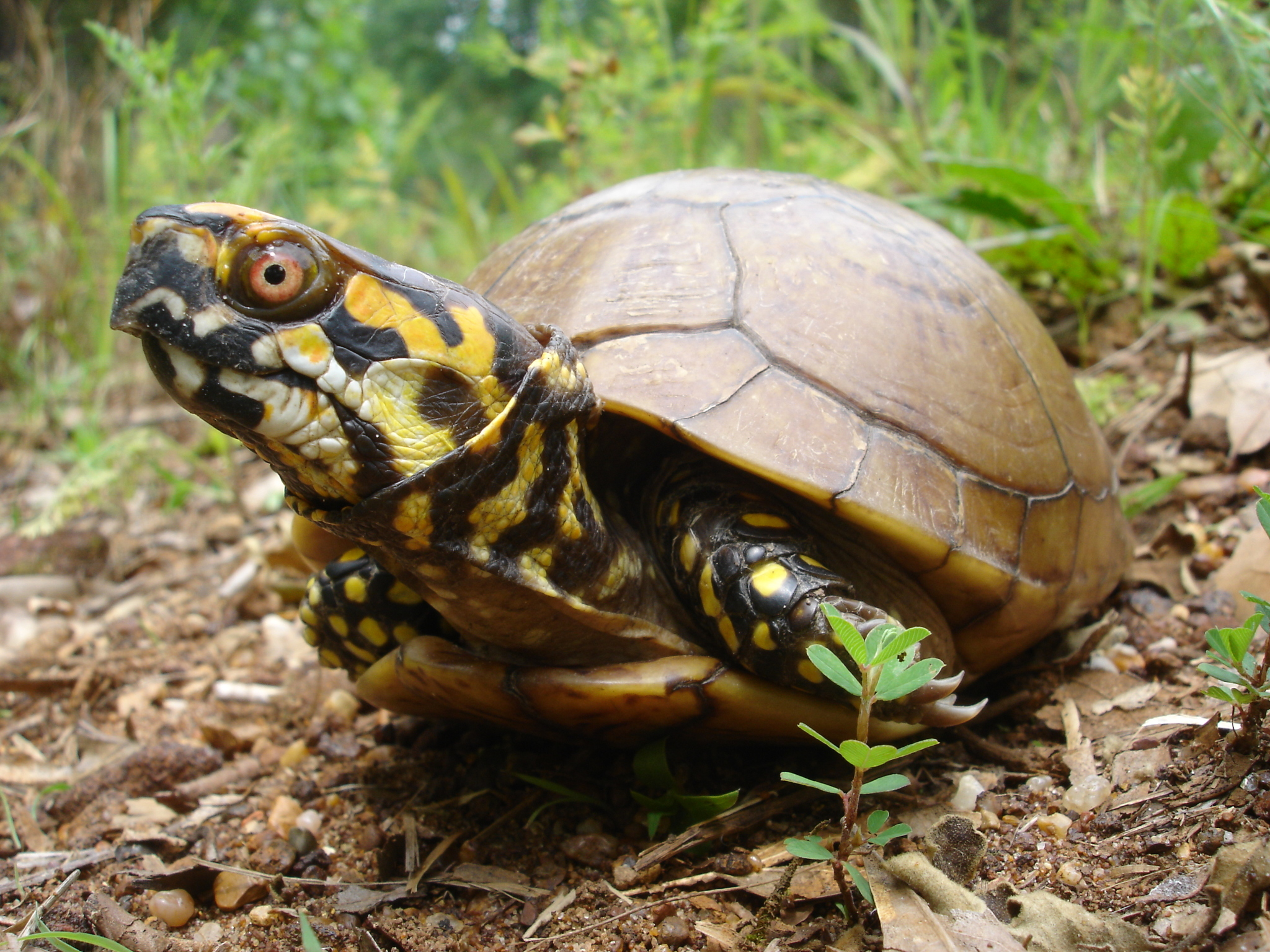
In Texas

Three-toed box turtles are so named due to the number of toes on the back feet, but some four-toed examples have been recorded as well. However, some speculate that the four-toed individuals are actually eastern box turtle × three-toed box turtle hybrids. Three-toed box turtles have a domed shell which grows to 5–7 inches (13–18 cm) in length. The highest part of its carapace or upper shell is more caudally positioned than in any of the other subspecies. The dorsal and limb coloration is commonly completely absent, although some dark blotches are common in adult turtles. These areas are more often a uniform olive green or tan color. Sometimes, faint yellow dots or lines are visible in the center of each large scute. In the males, the head and throat often display yellow, red, or orange spots. Frequently, the bottom shell or plastron is a straw yellow color, and has far fewer dark markings than the plastrons of the other subspecies.

== Diet ==
Three-toed box turtles are omnivores, their diets varying with availability of food sources and the seasons. They are known to eat earthworms, insects, snails, slugs, strawberries, mushrooms, and green-leafed vegetation. They have been observed eating the eggs of quail. All box turtles will prefer live foods to vegetation.

It has also been speculated that these turtles eat poisonous mushrooms, but are not themselves sickened by the mushroom's toxins. Afterwards, the turtles then become poisonous themselves. Archie Carr believed this to be the reason why a group of boys in Mississippi became ill after eating roasted three-toed box turtles.

== Behavior ==
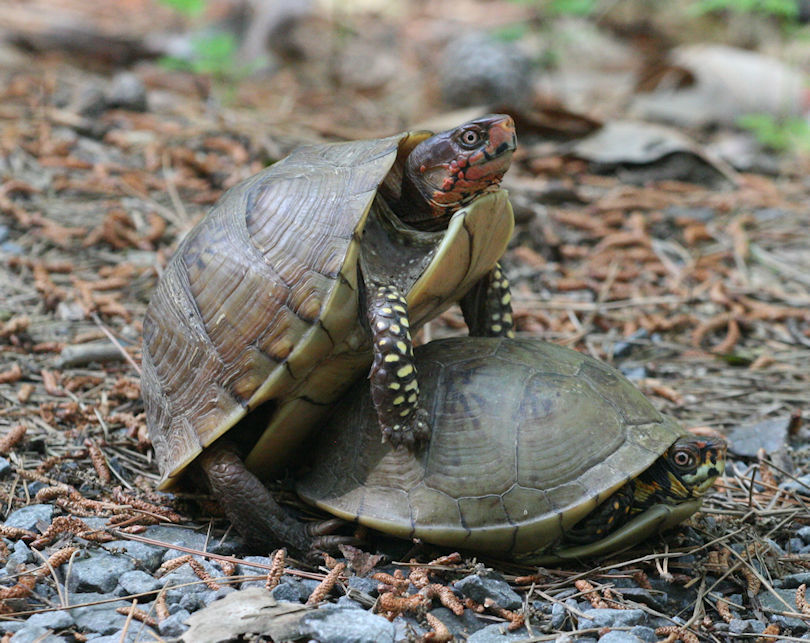
Mating, in Arkansas

Three-toed box turtles are known to migrate seasonally in order to maintain their preferred humidity level. In Arkansas, three-toed box turtles were observed in grasslands in late spring, while in early spring, summer, and late fall they were found in forested areas. During dry times, they dig shallow burrows into leaf litter to conserve moisture. When water is available, these turtles soak for longer periods of time than any of the other subspecies. Brumation is common in three-toed box turtles in order to preserve energy during cold months. They will bury themselves in the dirt and slow down their body processes for up to five months during the winter.

== Captivity ==
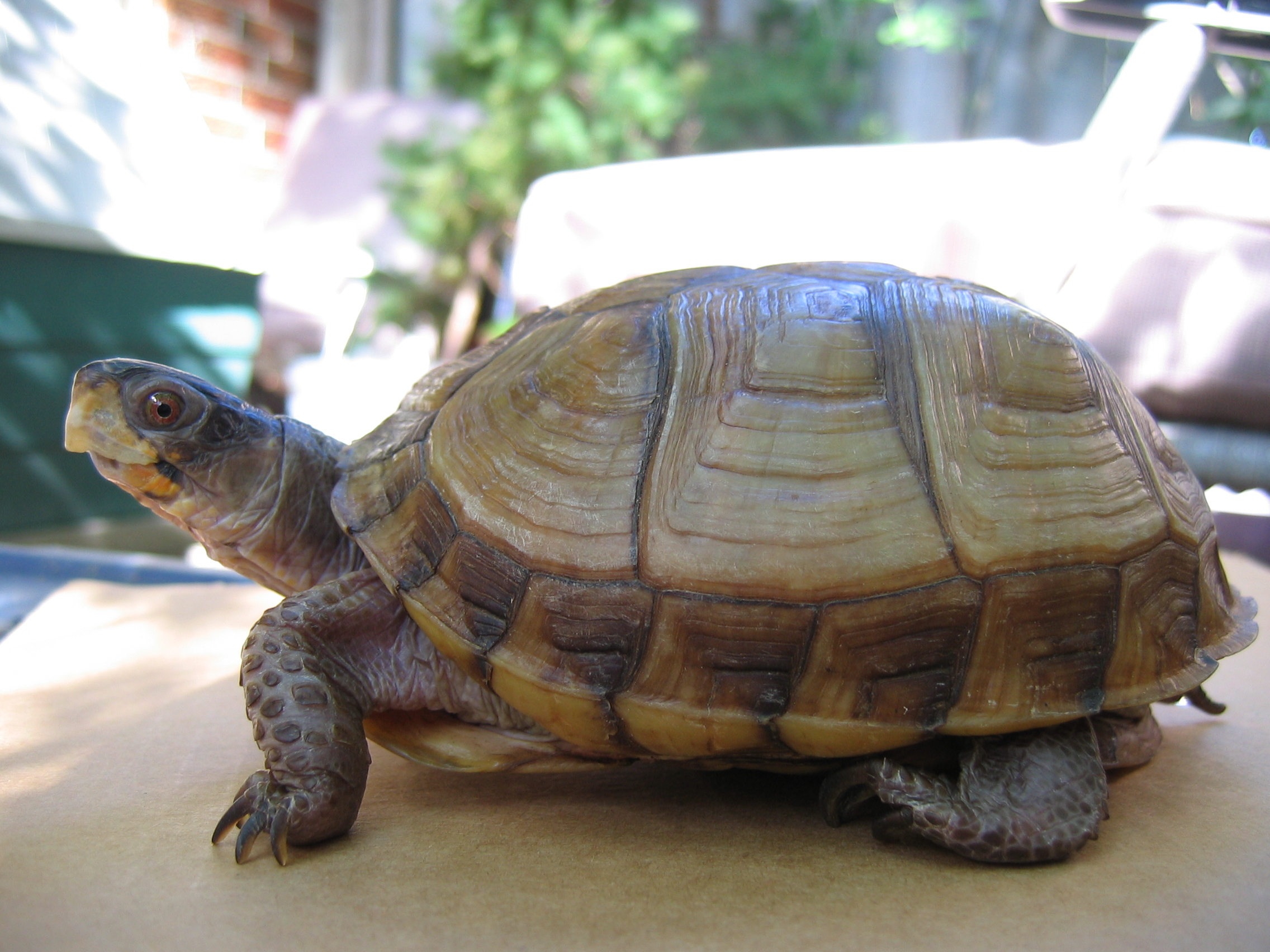
In captivity

Three-toed box turtles require care similar to that of other box turtles, faring best in large, outdoor enclosures. These enclosures should have plenty of room to allow the turtle to burrow, but should also be protected to prevent the turtle from burrowing under enclosure fencing. Indoors, three-toed box turtles should be kept in a large wooden enclosure measuring 6’L x 3’W x 2’H, or otherwise offering roughly 18 square feet of space.

An indoor enclosure should have a high temperature side with a heat bulb at around 85 °F and a lower temperature side at 70–75 °F. Humidity should average between 60 and 80%. The enclosure should also contain at least one humid cave or hideout for the turtle as well as an area where it can soak. A T5 HO UVB lamp of appropriate strength is required for survival indoors. Peat moss, coconut fiber, and clean topsoil all make acceptable substrates. Desert materials such as gravel or sand would be too dry and difficult for the turtle to dig into, and will cause small scratches susceptible to infections. Many owners simply spray the surface area of the enclosure down at the beginning of the day in order to moisten the material and to increase the humidity of the enclosure.

Three-toed box turtles can have lifespans of over 50 years in captivity.
