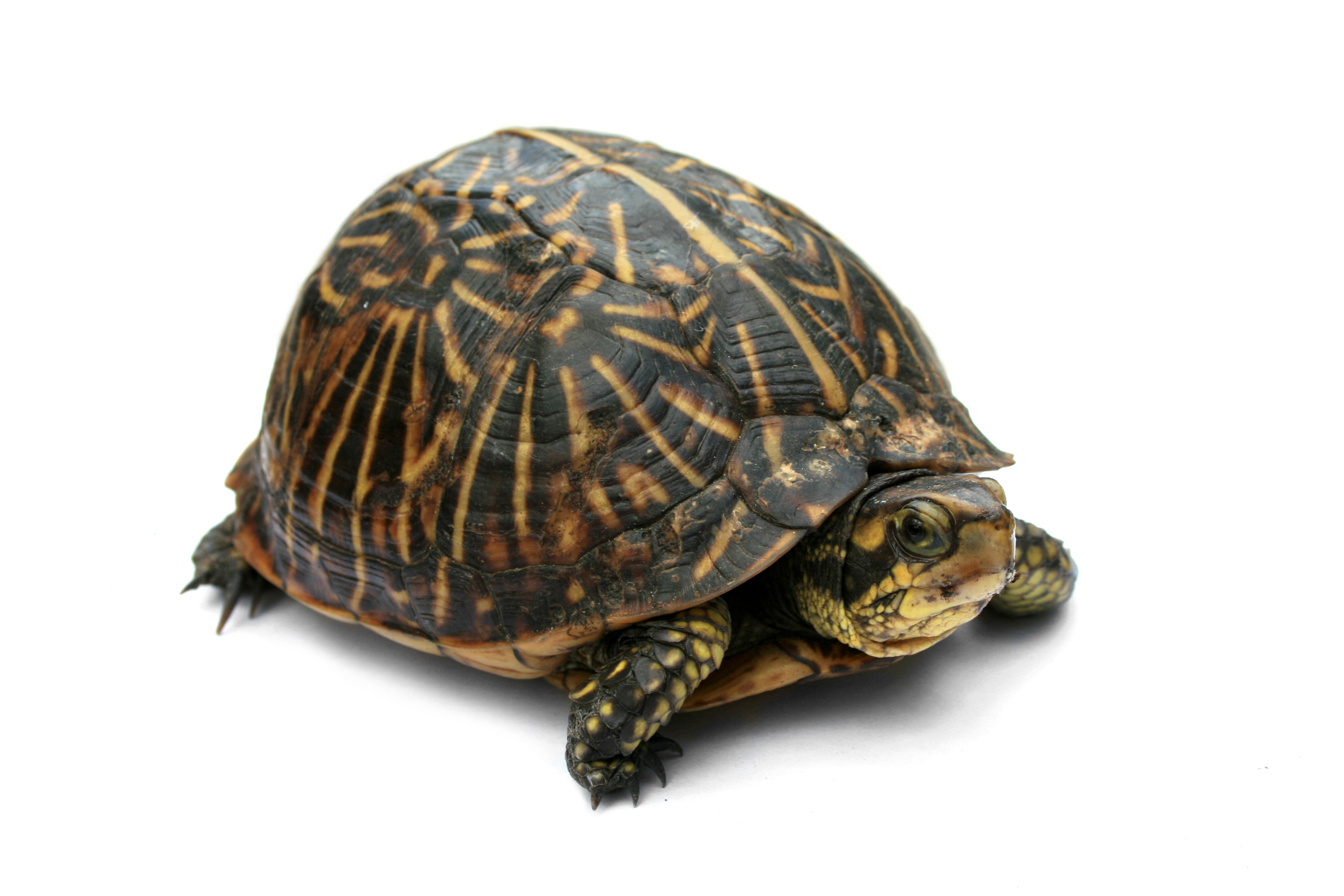

Conservation status
- Vulnerable (IUCN 3.1)
- CITES Appendix II

Scientific classification
- Kingdom: Animalia
- Phylum: Chordata
- Class: Reptilia
- Order: Testudines
- Suborder: Cryptodira
- Family: Emydidae
- Genus: Terrapene
- Species: T. carolina

Binomial name
- Terrapene carolina (Linnaeus, 1758)

Subspecies
- See text

Synonyms
- Testudo carolina Linnaeus, 1758; Testudo clausa Gmelin, 1789; Terrapene carolina Bell, 1825

= Common box turtle =

Species of turtle

The common box turtle (Terrapene carolina) is a species of box turtle with five existing subspecies. It is found throughout the Eastern United States and Mexico. The box turtle has a distinctive hinged lower shell that allows it to completely enclose itself, like a box. Its upper jaw is hooked. The turtle is primarily terrestrial and eats a wide variety of plants and animals. The females lay their eggs in the summer. Turtles in the northern part of their range hibernate over the winter.

Common box turtle numbers are declining because of habitat loss, roadkill, and capture for the pet trade. The species is classified as vulnerable to threats to its survival by the IUCN Red List. Two states have chosen subspecies of the common box turtle as their official state reptile: T. c. carolina in North Carolina and Tennessee.

== Classification ==
Terrapene carolina was first described by Carl Linnaeus in his landmark 1758 10th edition of Systema Naturae. It is the type species for the genus Terrapene and has more subspecies than the other three species within that genus. The eastern box turtle subspecies was the one recognized by Linnaeus. The other four subspecies were first classified during the 19th century. In addition, one extinct subspecies, T. c. putnami, is distinguished.

Subspecies

Image	Common name	Subspecies
	Eastern box turtle	Terrapene carolina carolina (Linnaeus, 1758)
	Florida box turtle	Terrapene carolina bauri Taylor, 1895
	Gulf Coast box turtle	Terrapene carolina major (Agassiz, 1857)
	Mexican box turtle	Terrapene carolina mexicana (Gray, 1849)
	Yucatán box turtle	Terrapene carolina yucatana (Boulenger, 1895)
	Giant box turtle	†Terrapene carolina putnami O.P. Hay, 1906

Nota bene: Parentheses around the name of an authority indicate the subspecies was originally described in a genus other than Terrapene.

== Description ==
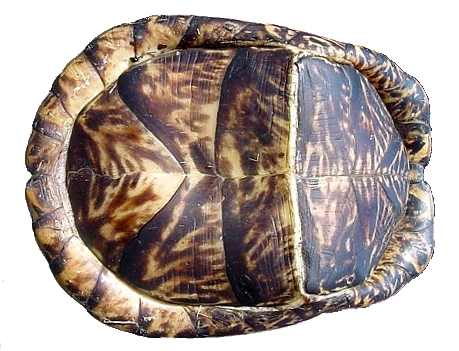
The hinges of the box turtle's lower shell

The common box turtle (Terrapene carolina) gets its common name from the structure of its shell which consists of a high domed carapace (upper shell), and large, hinged plastron (lower shell) which allows the turtle to close the shell, sealing its vulnerable head and limbs safely within an impregnable box. The carapace is brown, often adorned with a variable pattern of orange or yellow lines, spots, bars or blotches. The plastron is dark brown and may be uniformly coloured, or show darker blotches or smudges.

The common box turtle has a small to moderately sized head and a distinctive hooked upper jaw. The majority of adult male common box turtles have red irises, while those of the female are yellowish-brown. Males also differ from females by possessing shorter, stockier and more curved claws on their hind feet, and longer and thicker tails.

There are five living subspecies of the common box turtle, each differing slightly in appearance, namely in the colour and patterning of the carapace, and the possession of either three or four toes on each hind foot.

== Distribution ==
The common box turtle inhabits open woodlands, marshy meadows, floodplains, scrub forests and brushy grasslands in much of the eastern United States, from Maine and Michigan to eastern Texas and south Florida. It was once found in Canada in southern Ontario and is still found in Mexico along the Gulf Coast and in the Yucatán Peninsula. The species range is not continuous as the two Mexican subspecies, T. c. mexicana (Mexican box turtle) and T. c. yucatana (Yucatán box turtle), are separated from the US subspecies by a gap in western Texas. Three of the US subspecies; T. c. carolina (eastern box turtle), T. c. major (Gulf Coast box turtle) and T. c. bauri (Florida box turtle); occur roughly in the areas indicated by their names. The species has become extirpated from Ontario and Canada.

== Behavior ==
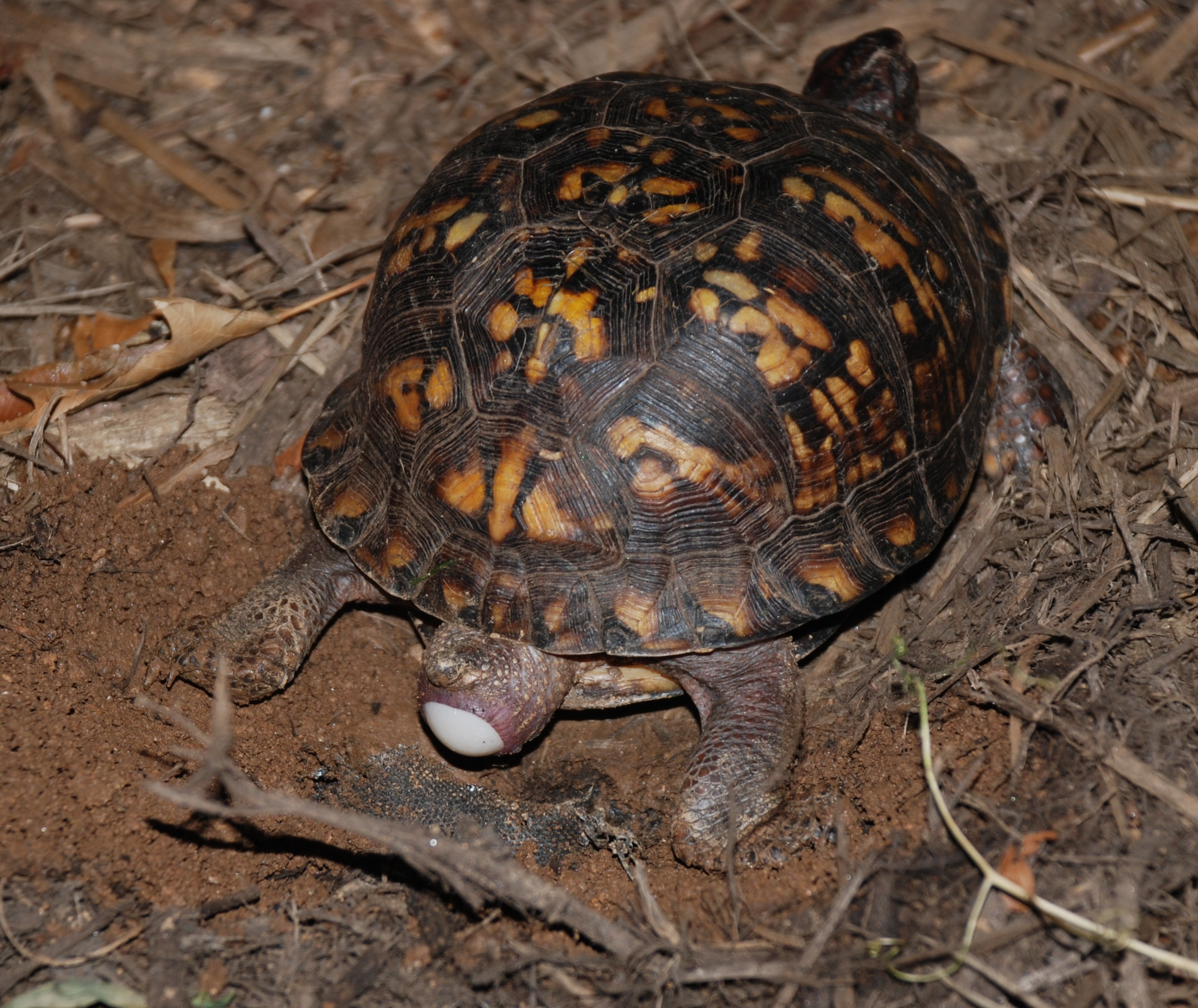
Egg-laying

Common box turtles are predominantly terrestrial reptiles that are often seen early in the day, or after rain, when they emerge from the shelter of rotting leaves, logs, or a mammal burrow to forage. These turtles have an incredibly varied diet of animal and plant matter, including earthworms, snails, slugs, insects, wild berries, roots, flowers, fungi, fish, frogs, salamanders, snakes, birds, eggs, and sometimes even animal carrion (in the form of dead ducks, amphibians, assorted small mammals, and even a dead cow).

In the warmer summer months, common box turtles are more likely to be seen near the edges of swamps or marshlands, possibly in an effort to stay cool. If common box turtles do become too hot, (when their body temperature rises to around 32 °C), they smear saliva over their legs and head; as the saliva evaporates it leaves them comfortably cooler. Similarly, the turtle may urinate on its hind limbs to cool the body parts it is unable to cover with saliva.

Courtship in the common box turtle, which usually takes place in spring, begins with a "circling, biting and shoving" phase. These acts are carried out by the male on the female. Following some pushing and shell-biting, the male grips the back of the female's shell with his hind feet to enable him to lean back, slightly beyond the vertical, and mate with the female. Remarkably, female common box turtles can store sperm for up to four years after mating, and thus do not need to mate each year.

In May, June or July, females normally lay a clutch of 1 to 11 eggs into a flask-shaped nest excavated in a patch of sandy or loamy soil. After 70 to 80 days of incubation, the eggs hatch, and the small hatchlings emerge from the nest in late summer. In the northern parts of its range, the common box turtle may enter hibernation in October or November. They burrow into loose soil, sand, vegetable matter, or mud at the bottom of streams and pools, or they may use a mammal burrow, and will remain in their chosen shelter until the cold winter has passed. The common box turtle has been known to attain the greatest lifespan of any vertebrate outside of the tortoises. One specimen lived to be at least 138 years of age.

== Human interaction ==
=== Conservation ===
Although the common box turtle has a wide range and was once considered common, many populations are in decline as a result of a number of diverse threats. Agricultural and urban development is destroying habitat, while human fire management is degrading it. Development brings with it an additional threat in the form of increased infrastructure, as common box turtles are frequently killed on roads and highways. Collection for the international pet trade may also impact populations in some areas. The life history characteristics of the common box turtle (long lifespan and slow reproductive rate) make it particularly vulnerable to such threats. The common box turtle is therefore classified as a vulnerable species on the IUCN Red List. The common box turtle is also listed on Appendix II of the Convention on International Trade in Endangered Species (CITES), meaning that international trade in this species should be carefully monitored to ensure it is compatible with the species' survival. In addition, many U.S. states regulate or prohibit the taking of this species. NatureServe considers it Secure.

This species also occurs in a number of protected areas, some of which are large enough to protect populations from the threat of development, while it may also occur in the Sierra del Abra Tanchipa Biosphere Reserve, Mexico. Conservation recommendations for the common box turtle include establishing management practices during urban developments that are sympathetic to this species, as well as further research into its life history and the monitoring of populations.

=== State reptiles ===
"The turtle watches undisturbed as countless generations of faster 'hares' run by to quick oblivion, and is thus a model of patience for mankind, and a symbol of our State's unrelenting pursuit of great and lofty goals."

— North Carolina Secretary of State

Common box turtles are official state reptiles of three U.S. states. North Carolina and Tennessee honor the eastern box turtle, Kansas adopted the ornate box turtle in 1986.

In Pennsylvania, the eastern box turtle made it through one house of the legislature, but failed to win final naming in 2009. In Virginia, bills to honor the eastern box turtle failed in 1999 and then in 2009. Although a sponsor of the original failed 1998 bill, in 2009, Delegate Frank Hargrove, of Hanover, asked why Virginia would make an official emblem of an animal that retreats into its shell when frightened and dies by the thousands crawling across roads. However, the main problem in Virginia was that the creature was too closely linked to neighbor state North Carolina.
