= Harriet Williams Russell Strong =

American social activist, inventor and conservationist

Harriet Russell Strong
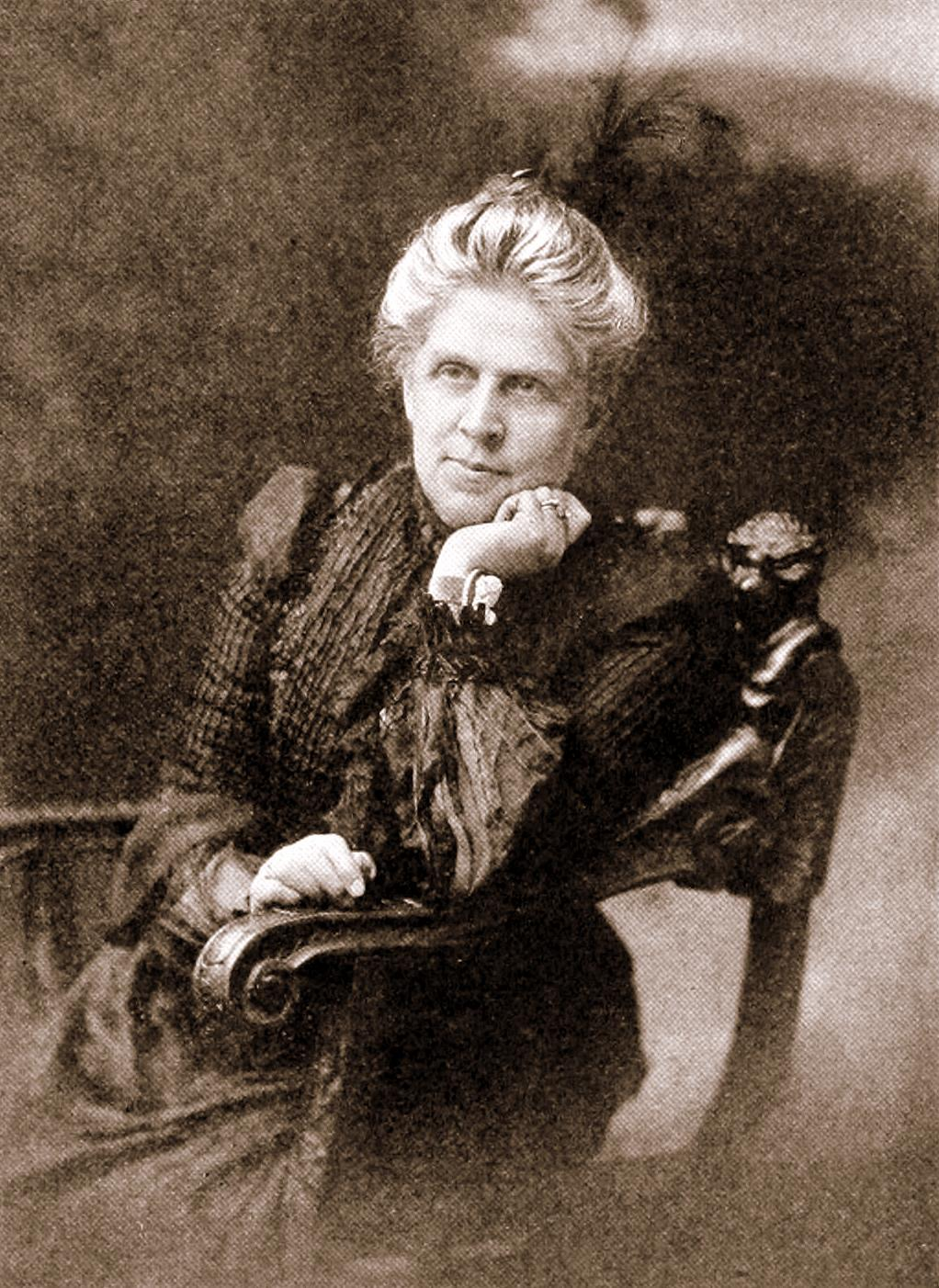
- Born: July 23, 1844; Buffalo, New York
- Died: September 6, 1926 (aged 82); Los Angeles County, California
- Occupations: Inventor, Philanthropist, suffragist and women's rights activist
- Spouse: Charles Lyman Strong
- Children: 4
- Awards: National Inventors Hall of Fame; National Women's Hall of Fame

Harriet Russell Strong (née Harriet Williams Russell; July 23, 1844 – September 6, 1926) was an American social activist, inventor, businesswoman, conservationist, and leading figure of the early woman's movement. She has been inducted into the National Women's Hall of Fame and the National Inventors Hall of Fame. Her pioneering innovations in water storage and flood control enabled the construction of the Hoover Dam and the All-American Canal.

== Childhood and family background ==
Harriet Williams Russell was born in Buffalo, New York, fourth daughter of Henry Pierrepont and Mary Guest (Musier) Russell. She was educated by private teachers and at Young Ladies Seminary at Benicia, California.

== Marriage and family ==
In 1861, the family moved again to Carson City, Nevada, where Harriet met her future husband, Charles Lyman Strong. She was married in Virginia City, Nevada at the age of nineteen, and at thirty-nine was left a widow with four daughters when her husband committed suicide after a series of business failures. Her husband's property, consisting of mines and other lands in Southern California, was involved in litigation lasting eight years. She then devoted her attention to the management and development of this estate, which was known as Ranchito del Fuerte in San Gabriel Valley, California. It was largely planted with walnut and orange trees, as well as pampas grass, and yielded profitable returns. In 1897 she drilled a number of artesian wells, and to utilize the water thus obtained purchased 1,000 acres (4.0 km^{2}) of land five miles (8 km) away, installed a pumping plant, and incorporated the property under the name of the Paso de Bartolo Water Company, of which she was president, and her two daughters, respectively, treasurer and secretary, and issued bonds amounting to $110,000 to carry on the enterprise, selling the property four years later at a handsome profit.

== Inventor and water conservationist ==
Harriet Strong made a study about the shortage of water, including the control of floodwaters and water storage. She advocated source conservation as a flood remedy, proposing a succession of dams in the Grand Canyon of the Colorado River to conserve the water for irrigation purposes and the generation of electricity. On Dec. 6, 1887, she was granted a patent for a dam and reservoir construction. Her invention consists of a series of dams, one behind the other, to be constructed in a valley, canyon or watercourse in such a way that when the water has filled the lower dam it will extend up to a certain height upon the lower face of the second dam, and thus act as a brace and support for the dam above it. She obtained another patent, Nov. 6, 1894, on a new method for impounding debris and storing water. She was awarded two medals for these inventions by the World's Columbian Exposition in Chicago, Illinois, in 1893. In 1918 she appeared before the congressional committee on water power and urged the government to store the floodwaters of the Colorado River by constructing a series of dams by her method in the Grand Canyon, (which in its full capacity is 150 miles (240 km) long), and thus control floods and increase irrigation water, making available thousands of acres of land and unlimited power for generating electricity.

== Later years ==
Strong had considerable talent as a musical composer; she published a number of songs and a book of musical sketches, and for many years was vice president of the Los Angeles Symphony Orchestra Association. She was the founder of Ebell of Los Angeles, serving as its president for three consecutive terms. She was also a member of the Friday Morning and Ruskin Art clubs of Los Angeles and became the first female member of the Los Angeles Chamber of Commerce, and of the executive board of the Inland Waterways Association of San Francisco. She was a delegate to the annual convention of the United States Chamber of Commerce, in Chicago, in 1918, representing both the Whittier and Los Angeles chambers of commerce, being the first woman delegate to attend those conventions. She was a member of the board of directors of the Whittier Chamber of Commerce, and chairman of its flood control committee, and member of its Law and Legislative committee, also a member of the Los Angeles Chamber of Commerce Legislative committee. She was responsible for preserving the adobe of Pio Pico, who had been a family friend when she first moved to Southern California.

Harriet Strong was a dedicated student of Christian Science and was a founding member of First Church of Christ, Scientist, Whittier, California. Her daughter Nellie became a Christian Science practitioner.

She had four daughters: Mary Lyman, wife of Dean Mason, of Los Angeles; Harriet Russell; Nelle de Luce Strong; and Georgina Pierrepont, wife of Hon. Frederick C. Hicks, of New York (who died in Washington, D.C., on January 1, 1918).

Strong died as a result of an automobile accident in 1926.
