= San Jose Hills =

Mountain range of the Transverse Ranges in California, United States

- Location within California Location within the United States

Highest point
- Peak: Buzzard Peak
- Elevation: 1,329 ft (405 m)

Geography
- Country: United States
- State: California
- District: Los Angeles County
- Range coordinates: 34°3′33.038″N 117°50′33.217″W
- Topo map: USGS San Dimas

The San Jose Hills are a part of the Transverse Ranges in eastern Los Angeles County, California, marking the border between the San Gabriel Valley and the Pomona Valley. It includes portions of Covina, West Covina, Walnut, Pomona, and San Dimas. To the south, the valley of San Jose Creek (a line followed by the Pomona Freeway) separates the San Jose Hills from the Puente Hills and Chino Hills.

== History ==
The Tongva village of Tooypinga was located at the base of the San Jose Hills. Spanish soldiers, who frequently conducted sweeps of the Los Angeles Basin abducting children to San Gabriel Mission and raping women, destroyed the village prior to 1785 as part of a raid.

== Geology ==
The San Jose Hills are part of the geologic history of Southern California. The San Gabriel Mountains (the Transverse ranges located north of the San Jose Hills) were uplifted by tectonic force as a result of the colliding Pacific and North American plates more than a billion years ago. This tectonic pressure created deeply fractured and fissured sheets of rock that began to shift direction about 25 million years ago. Gradually, a portion of this fissured rock began to uplift from the ocean, forming the Los Angeles Basin. Further folding and fissures helped form other uplifts that include both the San Jose Hills and Puente Hills. These hills, prone to erosion, were formed with their domed appearance while still submerged under water. The San Jose Hills Fault has the possible magnitude of 6.0 to 6.5 and last was active in 1990.

The San Jose Hills' highest point is Buzzard Peak at 1,319 feet (402 m). The highest elevations are composed of conglomerate rock with small, shallow patches of soil. At the bases, silty clay loam dominates. These geologic conditions restrain water absorption towards the rockier higher elevations, which allow runoff to hydrate the base, creating a more habitable (friendly) environment for plants. Because of the transverse (east-west) orientation of the range, this effect is pronounced on the north slope due to the lower rates of evaporation caused by sunlight directed from the south.

== Plant communities and wildlife ==
The San Jose Hills are diverse with unique and rare plant communities. The dominant plant community is coastal sage scrub, known for its high adaptations for long dry summers and is drought deciduous. Prickly-pear cactus can also be found there. Along the northern slopes, especially in the cracks and valleys, one can find pockets of California oak woodland, characterized by coast live oak and Southern California black walnut trees. Southern California black walnut woodlands are increasingly rare and threatened. The largest remaining stands are in the San Jose Hills and Puente Hills to the south.

Mammals, birds, reptiles, and amphibians are very diverse in both the San Jose Hills and surrounding San Gabriel Valley. Mammals in the San Jose Hills include bobcats, coyotes, gray fox, skunks, opossums, squirrels, and other rodents. The bird diversity is exceptional, and notable species include California quail, least Bell's vireo, coastal California gnatcatcher, grasshopper sparrow, southwest willow flycatcher, and red-tailed hawk. Reptiles and amphibians include various lizards and snakes, the California red-legged frog, southwestern arroyo toad, southwestern pond turtle, and other frogs and salamanders.

== Culture and recreation ==
On the most northeastern border, Fairplex (Los Angeles County Fairgrounds) offers an annual L.A. County Fair and other events throughout the year. Fairplex is also the location of both the Los Angeles County Railroad Museum and the Wally Parks NHRA Motorsports Museum. Automotive racing enthusiasts can enjoy adjacent Pomona Raceway-Dragstrip.

Two parks with significant natural areas are located in the eastern portion of the San Jose Hills; Ganesha Park include four picnic pavilions, a community center, amphitheater style band Shell, Olympic size swimming pool with slide, basketball courts, two lighted tennis courts, wildlife and hiking areas, and restroom facilities. Frank G. Bonelli Regional Park has 250-acre (1.0 km^{2}) Puddingstone Reservoir, used for swimming, water skiing, wind surfing, and sailing. The lake is also stocked with trout, bluegill, catfish, and large-mouth bass. Bonelli Park facilities include boat launch ramps, vehicle camp sites, trails for hiking, biking and horseback riding, play equipment, gazebos, and group rental picnic areas.

East of Bonelli Park is Mountain Meadows Golf Course, and on the west, Via Verde Country Club; the latter is south of Walnut Creek Park, a San Dimas city park along Walnut Creek, which drains Puddingstone Reservoir to the west into the San Gabriel Valley.

Several large institutions of higher education are located in the hills. These include California Polytechnic State University, Pomona (Cal Poly Pomona); Mount San Antonio College (Mt. SAC), and Pacific West Bible College. The Voorhis Ecological Reserve in the northwest part of the Cal Poly Pomona campus contains 31 ha of coastal sage scrub and oak woodland. Biotrek is an educational program ran by the Biological Sciences Department. Biotrek includes a Rainforest greenhouse, a native plant garden, aquatic environments, and laboratories. Mt. Sac has a 10-acre (40,000 m^{2}) native Wildlife Sanctuary.

Interment is provided by Forest Lawn Memorial Park and Mortuary. Near the Grand Avenue corridor, Heritage Gardens Historical Park, located on the north slope, was recently redeveloped to include new hiking trails. Walnut Ranch Park can be found on the south slope.

Along Citrus Avenue, one can find South Hills Country Club. Three parks exists along the south slopes: Shadow Oak Park, Creekside Park, and Gingrich Park. On the western portion of the hills is the Industry Hills Recreation Center and smaller Rimgrove and Woodgrove parks. Just east of Azusa Avenue, along the north slopes is Galster Wilderness Park with its new Galster Park Nature Center operated by the San Gabriel Mountains Regional Conservancy and 40 acres (160,000 m^{2}) of Walnut Woodland. The southern slope is West Covina's newest development, Big League Dreams. This mega-sports complex was built on top of a superfund site, the old BKK landfill.

== See also ==
- South San Jose Hills, California
