= Galster Wilderness Park Nature Center =

California parkland

Coordinates: 34°02′36″N 117°54′02″W

The Galster Wilderness Park Nature Center is a small museum and educational center set in Galster Wilderness Park, a 42-acre (170,000 m^{2}) wilderness park located on the north slope of the San Jose Hills in the San Gabriel Valley, California. It is operated by the San Gabriel Mountains Regional Conservancy in partnership with the City of West Covina, California.

The center is named after Emil S. and Gladys Galster, who deeded the park to the City of West Covina in 1971. Emil and Gladys Galster stipulated that the park will always remain a wilderness park and be available for educational use to scouting organizations.

Galster Wilderness is one of the last remaining native plant communities of Southern California Black Walnut Woodlands, Juglans californica trees, which grow on the north slope of the San Jose Hills. Besides the non-natives, coastal sage scrub dominates the remainder of the park.

== See also ==
- California chaparral and woodlands ecoregion
