= San Gabriel Valley =

Populated valley in Southern California, United States

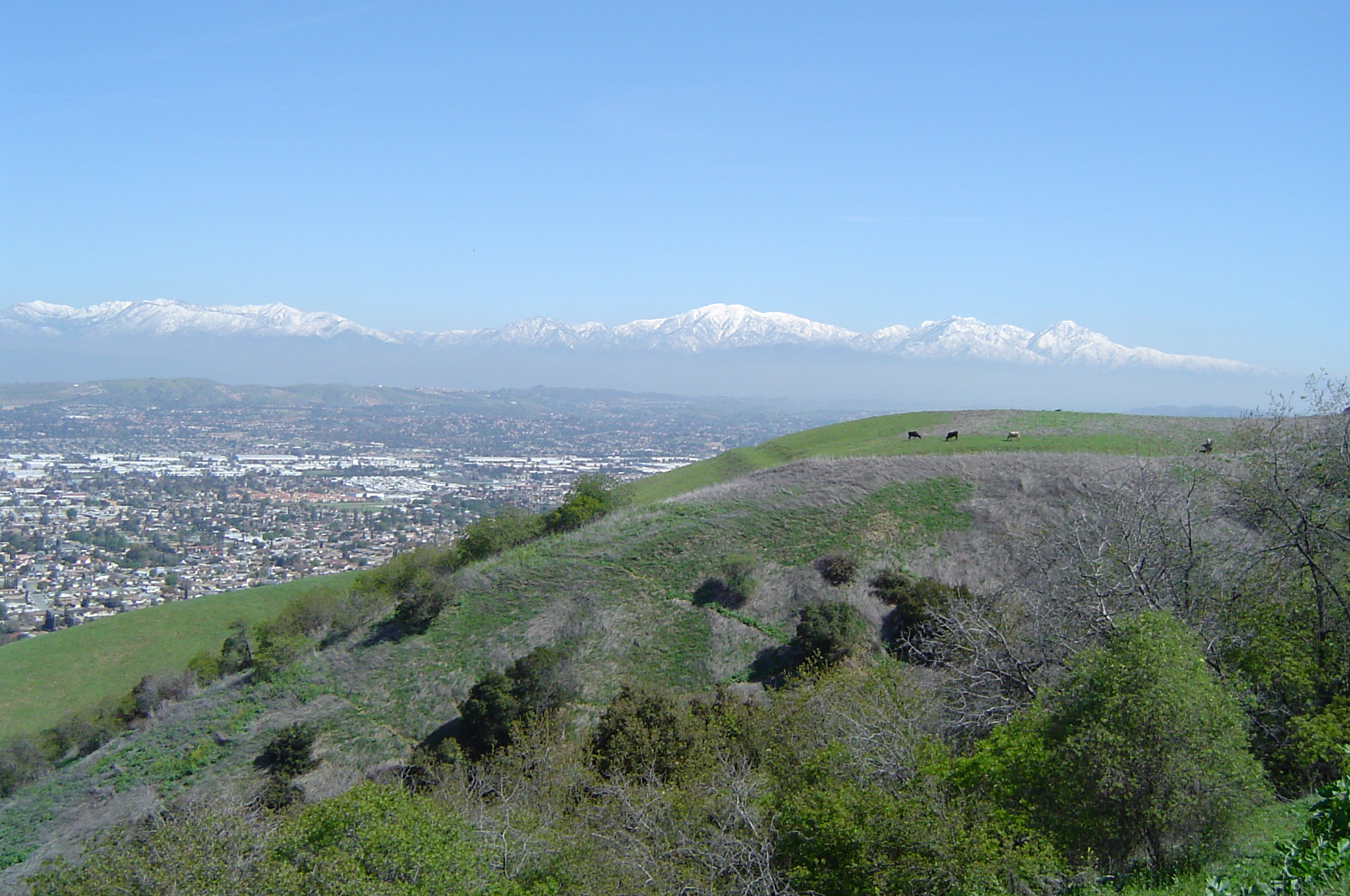
- Looking north from the Puente Hills above Rowland Heights
- Area: 200 sq mi (520 km^{2})

Geography
- Location: California, United States
- Borders on: San Gabriel Mountains (north), San Rafael Hills (west), Puente Hills (south), Chino Hills and San Jose Hills (east)
- Coordinates: 34.1°N 118.0°W
- Interactive map of San Gabriel Valley

The San Gabriel Valley (Spanish: Valle de San Gabriel), sometimes referred to by its initials as SGV, is one of the principal valleys of Southern California, with the city of Los Angeles directly bordering it to the west, and occupying the vast majority of the southeastern part of Los Angeles County. Surrounding landforms and other features include:

- the San Gabriel Mountains to the north
- the Crescenta Valley to the northwest
- the San Rafael Hills to the west
- the Repetto Hills to the southwest, with the Los Angeles Basin beyond
- the Puente Hills to the southeast, with the coastal plain of Orange County beyond
- the Chino Hills and San Jose Hills to the east, with the Pomona Valley and Inland Empire beyond

The San Gabriel Valley derives its name from the San Gabriel River that flows southward through the center of the valley, which itself was named for the Spanish Mission San Gabriel Arcángel originally built in the Whittier Narrows in 1771.

Once predominantly agricultural, the San Gabriel Valley today is almost entirely urbanized and is an integral part of the Greater Los Angeles metropolitan area. It is one of the most ethnically diverse regions in the country. Covering about 200 sq mi (520 km^{2}) in area, the valley includes 31 cities and five unincorporated communities. It is located entirely within Los Angeles County.

Pasadena is the largest city in the San Gabriel Valley. It was incorporated in 1886, making it the fourth city in Los Angeles County, following Los Angeles, Santa Ana, and Anaheim. The latter two are both now located in Orange County, which broke off from LA County in 1889. More recently, statewide droughts have further strained the San Gabriel Valley's and Los Angeles County's water security.

== Cities and communities ==
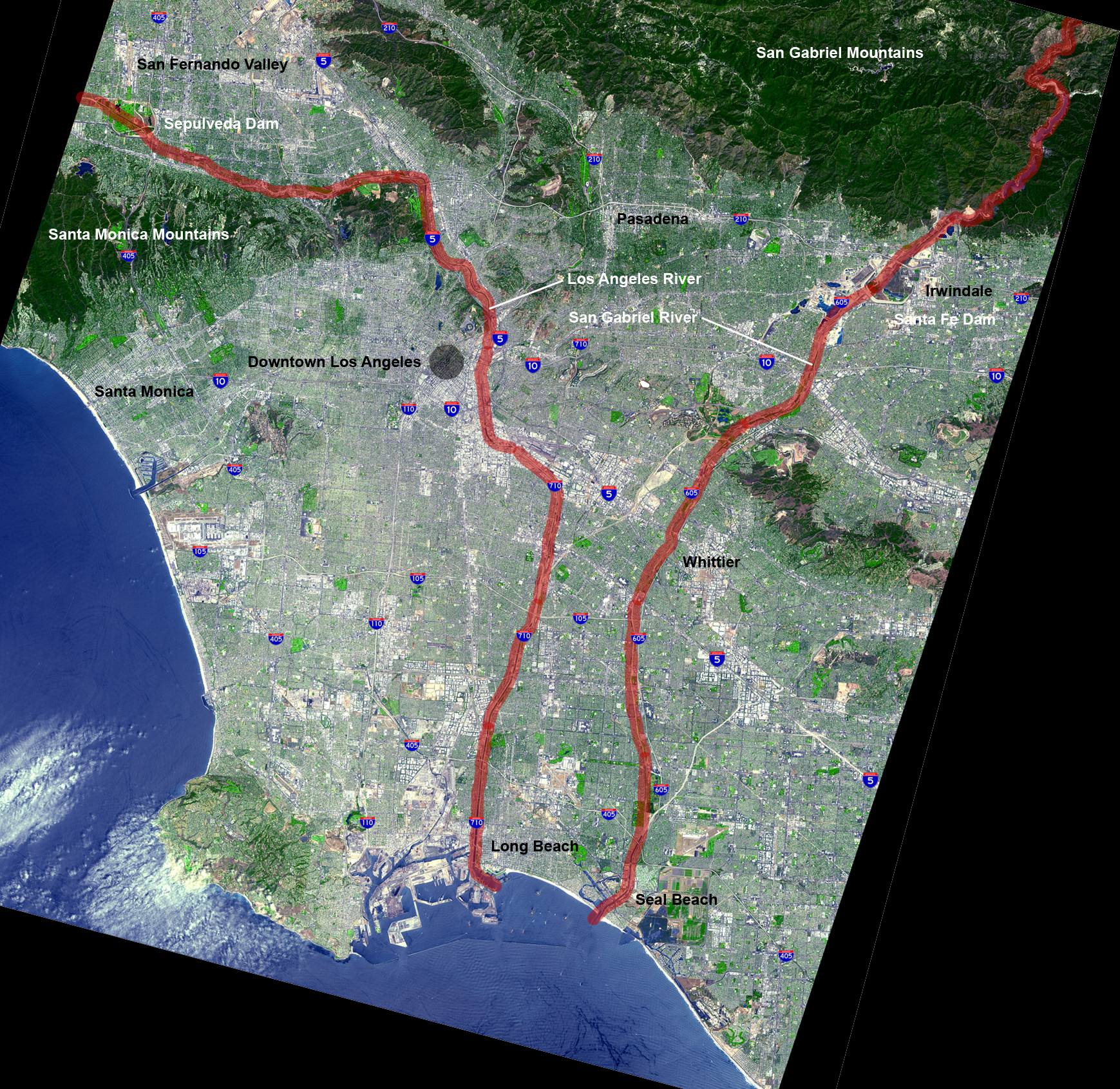
Los Angeles River, highlighted in red (on the left). The San Gabriel River is highlighted in red on the right.

The incorporated cities and unincorporated neighborhoods of the San Gabriel Valley include:

- Alhambra
- Altadena
- Arcadia
- Avocado Heights
- Azusa
- Baldwin Park
- Bassett
- Bradbury
- Claremont
- Charter Oak
- Citrus
- City of Industry
- Covina
- Diamond Bar
- Duarte
- East Pasadena
- East San Gabriel
- El Monte
- Glendora
- Hacienda Heights
- Irwindale
- La Cañada Flintridge
- La Puente
- La Verne
- Mayflower Village
- Monrovia
- Montebello (northern portion)
- Monterey Park
- North El Monte
- Pasadena
- Pomona
- Ramona
- Rosemead
- Rowland Heights
- Rose Hills
- San Dimas
- San Gabriel
- San Marino
- San Pasqual
- Sierra Madre
- South El Monte
- South Pasadena
- South San Gabriel
- South San Jose Hills
- Temple City
- Valinda
- Vincent
- Walnut
- West Covina
- West Puente Valley

Whittier, California, late 19th century

Whittier, like Montebello, is considered a part of the Gateway Cities region. An unincorporated portion of Whittier, Rose Hills, sits below the Puente Hills. While Montebello is considered to be part of the Gateway Cities region, the northern portion of Montebello is part of the San Gabriel Valley.

Claremont, La Verne, and Pomona are adjacent to the San Gabriel Valley, and though they are properly considered part of the Pomona Valley, they are also commonly considered part of the San Gabriel Valley. The 57 Freeway (Orange Freeway) is generally considered the dividing line between the Pomona and San Gabriel valleys. However, for statistical and economic development purposes, the County of Los Angeles generally includes these three cities as part of the San Gabriel Valley. The community of El Sereno, in the city of Los Angeles, is situated at the westernmost edge of the Valley. Unofficial estimates place the combined population of the San Gabriel Valley at around 2 million—roughly a fifth of the population of Los Angeles County.

== Early history ==
Before the arrival of the Spaniards, the land along the Rio Hondo River, a branch of the San Gabriel River, was populated by the Tongva people. The Tongva occupied much of the Los Angeles basin and the islands of Santa Catalina, San Nicolas, San Clemente, and Santa Barbara. In the northern part of the valley were the Hahanog-na Indian tribe, a branch of the Tongva Nation (part of the Shoshone language group) who lived in villages scattered along the Arroyo Seco and the canyons from the mountains down to the South Pasadena area. In 1542, when the explorer Juan Rodriguez Cabrillo arrived off the shores of San Pedro and Santa Catalina. The Tongva were the people who rowed the remarkable Ti'ats (plank canoes) out to meet Cabrillo. The language of the Tongva was different from the neighboring Indian tribes and it was called Gabrielino by the Spanish. The Tongva also provide the origin of many current names; Piwongna – Pomona, Cucomog-na – Cucamonga. The Gabrielinos lived in dome-like structures with thatched exteriors. Both sexes wore long hair styles and tattooed their bodies. During warm weather the men wore little clothing, but the women would wear minimal skirts made of animal hides. During the cold weather they would wear animal skin capes. European diseases killed many of the Tongva and by 1870 the area had few remaining native inhabitants. Today, several bands of Tongva people live in the Los Angeles area.

The first Europeans to see inland areas of California were the members of the 1769 Portolà expedition, which traveled north by land after establishing the first Spanish settlement in today's state of California at San Diego. On July 30, the expedition crossed the San Gabriel River and continued north toward what is now the city of Los Angeles. To cross the river, the expedition built a rough bridge, which gave the name La Puente to today's San Gabriel Valley city, and hills to the south are called the Puente Hills. A few years later, a mission was established near the river crossing.

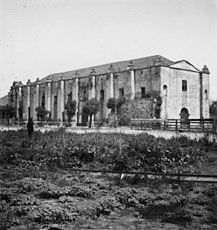
Mission San Gabriel Arcángel c. 1900. The trail in the foreground is part of the original El Camino Real.

Mission San Gabriel Arcangel was founded by Franciscan Father Junipero Serra, first head of the Spanish missions in California, on September 8, 1771. Its original location, called Mission Vieja, was near where San Gabriel Boulevard now crosses the Rio Hondo, which is also near the present day Juan Matias Sanchez Adobe. Angel Somera and Pedro Cambon were the first missionary priests at the new mission, which marked the beginning of the Los Angeles region's settlement by Spaniards. The San Gabriel mission was the third of twenty-one missions that would ultimately be established along California's El Camino Real.

The San Gabriel mission did well in establishing cattle ranching and farming, but six years after its founding a destructive flood led the mission fathers to relocate the establishment to its current location farther north in present-day city of San Gabriel. The original mission site is now marked by a California Historical Landmark.

During the early years of the mission, the region operated under a Rancho system. The lands which now compose the city of Montebello were originally parts of Rancho San Antonio, Rancho La Merced, and Rancho Paso de Bartolo. The Juan Matias Sanchez Adobe, built in 1844, remains standing at the center of old Rancho La Merced in Eastern Montebello in the La Merced area. Recently restored, it is the city's oldest structure.

Mission San Gabriel Arcángel served a central role in Spanish colonial society, with many of the area's first Mexican settlers being baptized at the mission, including Pio Pico, who was born and baptized at the mission in 1801. He became governor of California twice, in 1832 and in 1845 and the city of Pico Rivera was named honoring him as the last Mexican governor of California.

The Battle of Rio San Gabriel took place in Montebello on January 8, 1847, on the banks of the Rio Hondo. This battle gave the control of Los Angeles and Alta California to the United States and was a decisive battle in the Mexican-American War. Two days later, after several battle losses and defeats, Mexico was forced to cede Alta California to the United States. By 1852, after USA occupation, San Gabriel became one of the first townships in the County of Los Angeles. Today the battle site is California State Historical Landmark #385, and there are two old cannon and a plaque commemorating the battle overlooking the river on Bluff Rd. and Washington Blvd.

In 1853, with a contingent of Army Engineers passing through searching for the best route to build a railroad, Geologist William P. Blake observed that the once-extensive vineyards were falling to decay, with fences broken down and animals roaming freely through it. However, the mission church was still in use. Blake predicted, "I believe that when the adaptation of that portion of California to the culture of the grape and the manufacture of wine becomes known and appreciated, the state will become celebrated not only for its gold and grain, but for it fruits and wines.

Following the U.S. Civil War, some 5,000 acres (20 km^{2}) of the East Los Angeles region were owned by an Italian settler from Genoa, Alessandro Repetto. After Repetto's death in 1885, his brother sold his rancho to a consortium of five Los Angeles businessmen including banker Isaias Hellman and wholesale grocer/historian Harris Newmark for $60,000, about $12 an acre.

Chinese, Japanese, Filipino, and South Asian pioneers and settlers first came to the San Gabriel Valley in the mid-19th century. These emigrants worked the fields, picked the grapes and citrus fruit, and built part of the infrastructure of today's San Gabriel Valley. In the 1920s Japanese immigrants arrived in Monterey Park to work as farmhands.

The discovery of oil by Standard Oil Company in the Montebello hills in 1917 brought about a revolutionary change to the locality. The agricultural hills soon became a major contributor to oil production. By 1920, the San Gabriel Valley's oil fields were producing one-eighth of California's crude oil. For several decades, the hills were dotted with active oil wells.

The cities of Whittier, Covina, and Pasadena were formerly the sites of the citrus industry. In addition, the oil, dairy, and cattle industries used to flourish in the southern part of the region. Many equestrian trails in the San Gabriel Valley — specifically, those in Covina and Walnut — have disappeared or fallen into disuse. The remaining rural areas include the land between eastern West Covina and Cal Poly Pomona and in Walnut, Diamond Bar, and La Puente.

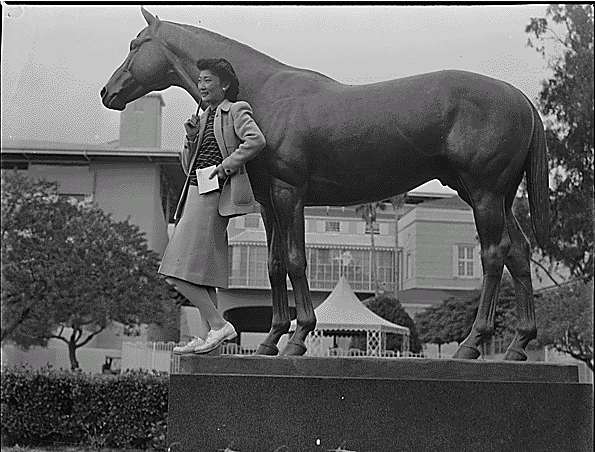
Japanese-American woman held at Santa Anita Park during World War II, with the statue of Seabiscuit, 1942

== Demographics and ethnic diversity ==
The total population of the San Gabriel Valley in the 2000 Census was 1,510,378 people, of which 1,425,596 were living in the 30 incorporated cities. The average size of a household in the San Gabriel Valley according to the 2000 Census was 3.28 persons compared with 2.98 persons for Los Angeles County as a whole. Eight cities in the Valley have average household sizes of over four persons, while an unincorporated area, the South San Jose Hills, was at a significant 5.07 persons per household. (Most addresses do not use South San Jose Hills as the city but use La Puente, West Covina, or Valinda.) At the other end of this scale is Sierra Madre, at 2.20 persons per household.

The age distribution in the San Gabriel Valley was a little unusual when compared with the county. A larger share of the population was aged 10–19, 15.5% versus 14.8% for the county. Also, the Valley had a higher share of people over 45 years of age. The income ranges in the San Gabriel Valley area are also quite wide. The highest median household income was found in San Marino ($117,267), followed by Bradbury ($100,454). At the other end of the scale was El Monte with a median household income of $32,439. Four other cities in the Valley had household incomes of less than $40,000.

Significant percentages of all major ethnic groups reside in San Gabriel Valley communities, and the area is in general one of the most ethnically diverse regions in the country. The largest groups residing in the San Gabriel Valley are those of Hispanic and Asian-American origin. The communities of Glendora, La Verne, Claremont, Monrovia, Sierra Madre, Pasadena, South Pasadena, and San Dimas have significant White populations.

The Gabrieleno/Tongva of San Gabriel are headquartered in San Gabriel. A small Native American population is also located in Arcadia, Rowland Heights, Walnut, and Diamond Bar. Despite the European influx they remained an integral part of the Southern California community, and continue to in the present day.

The African-American population in the San Gabriel Valley is relatively low. However, there are sizable, long-established African-American communities in the western Altadena area and in northwest Pasadena, as well as in Monrovia.

Montebello is home to the oldest Armenian community in Los Angeles County. It contains Holy Cross Armenian Apostolic Cathedral, which was the only Armenian cathedral in California until Saint Leon Cathedral was built in Burbank in 2012. The Armenian Martyrs Monument at Bicknell Park commemorating the victims of the Armenian Genocide by the Ottoman Turks is the largest monument of the genocide found on public property in the world. The Armenian community of Pasadena has its roots in the 1890s. The Pashgian Bros. Oriental Rugs and Fine Carpets was established in 1889.

Hispanic residents, predominately Mexican Americans, are concentrated in Alhambra, Baldwin Park, City of Industry, El Monte, Hacienda Heights, La Puente, Montebello, Rosemead, San Gabriel, South El Monte, West Covina, Covina, Pomona, and Whittier, with significant populations in Pasadena and South Pasadena.

=== Asian-American population ===
The San Gabriel Valley has the largest concentration of East Asian American communities in the United States, located primarily in the southwestern part of the San Gabriel Valley. Eight of the ten cities in the United States with the largest proportion of Chinese Americans are located in the San Gabriel Valley. The cities and communities of Monterey Park, Walnut, Alhambra, San Gabriel, San Marino, Rowland Heights, Hacienda Heights, Diamond Bar, and Arcadia form a large Asian-American community.

There are many Filipino Americans in the communities of West Covina and Walnut. Vietnamese Americans tend to be concentrated in San Gabriel, Rosemead, and El Monte. Many Korean Americans live in Hacienda Heights, Rowland Heights, and Diamond Bar. A longstanding Japanese-American community exists in Monterey Park.

Early Chinese pioneers settled into the Valley mostly as laborers. They packed oranges, picked walnuts, did construction, owned or worked in laundries, and worked as cooks and servants in the homes of the wealthy. Mostly a bachelor society (especially after the Page Act of 1875 banned Chinese women), the early Chinese did not leave many descendants. By the late 1880s, there was a growing Japanese pioneer population. Filipinos and Asian Indians also served as laborers in the valley. Immigration of Chinese laborers was banned by the 1882 Chinese Exclusion Act until 1943.

Almost a century later, the San Gabriel Valley's burgeoning population of Asian Americans has become a dominant cultural force. Several business districts developed to serve their needs creating a collection of Southern California Chinatowns loosely connected along the Valley Boulevard Corridor. This trend began in the city of Monterey Park during the late 1970s when many well-to-do Taiwanese professionals began settling in the area. Initially, many Chinese restaurateurs and business owners used primarily Traditional Chinese script and not English names on their business signs. This changed in 1986, when the city council of Monterey Park enacted an ordinance requiring all businesses to translate their business signs and describe the nature of their businesses in English, deemed a matter of public safety.

Monterey Park is a microcosm of changing demographics, highlighting Asian American history and evolution in the San Gabriel Valley. Rosemead has a smaller group of Vietnamese and Chinese business districts. There are also small pockets of Chinese American businesses that are scattered throughout San Gabriel Valley cities. In Rowland Heights, a handful of Korean American strip malls co-exist with Chinese American businesses. Another ethnic enclave is the Filipino American business district of Little Manila, in West Covina along with an Asian indoor and outdoor shopping center. Small Chinatowns have sprung up in many cities throughout the valley.

By the 2010 census there were more than half a million Asian Americans living in San Gabriel Valley. While smaller than the Latino population in the valley, it outnumbered the White population, and had a faster growth rate. More than a quarter of the population in the region are Asian American. The largest populations of Asian Americans in San Gabriel Valley were Chinese, Filipinos, Vietnamese, Korean, Taiwanese, and Japanese.

Burmese Americans are concentrated in Alhambra.

== Arts and culture ==
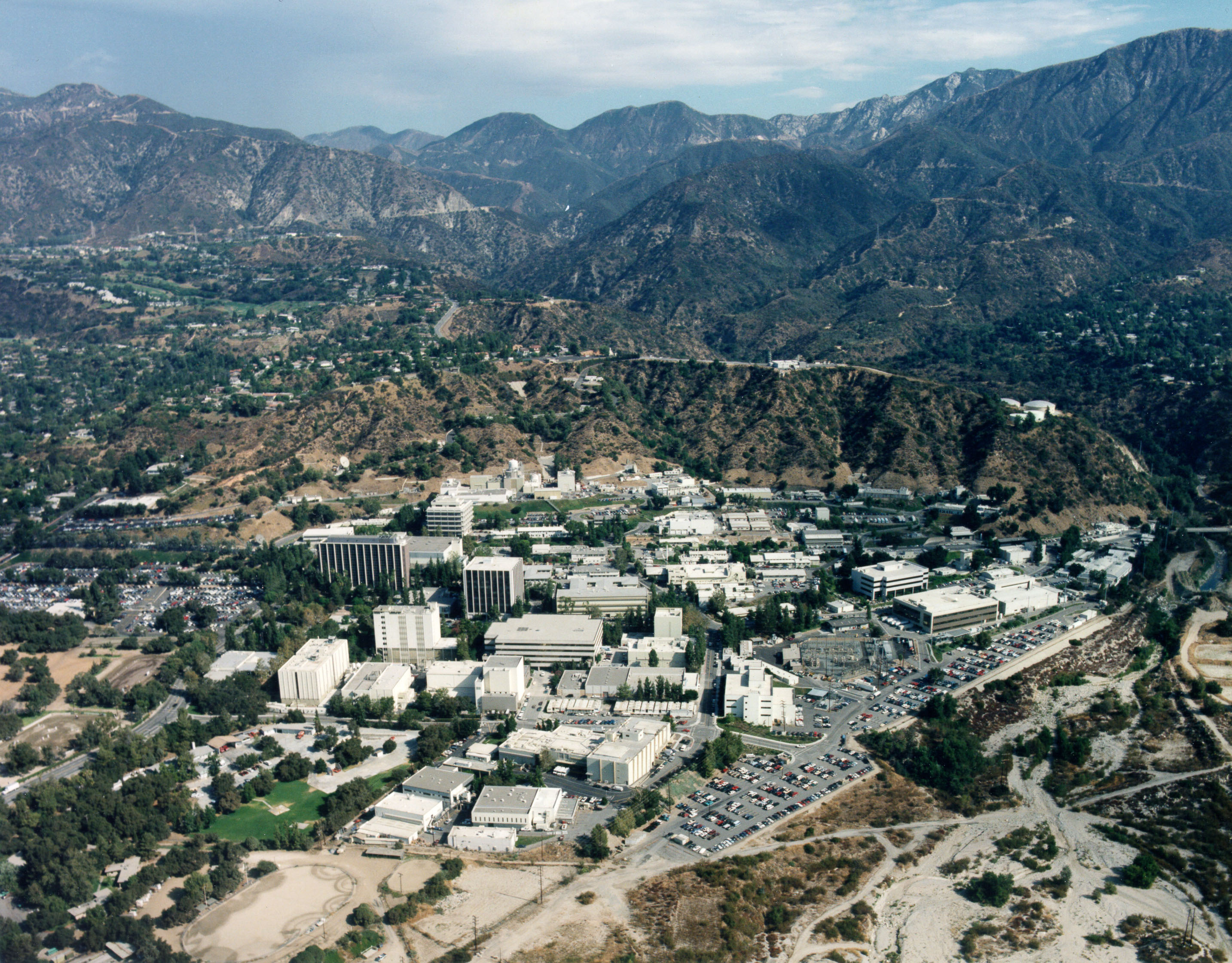
The Jet Propulsion Laboratory complex in La Cañada Flintridge. Courtesy NASA/JPL-Caltech.

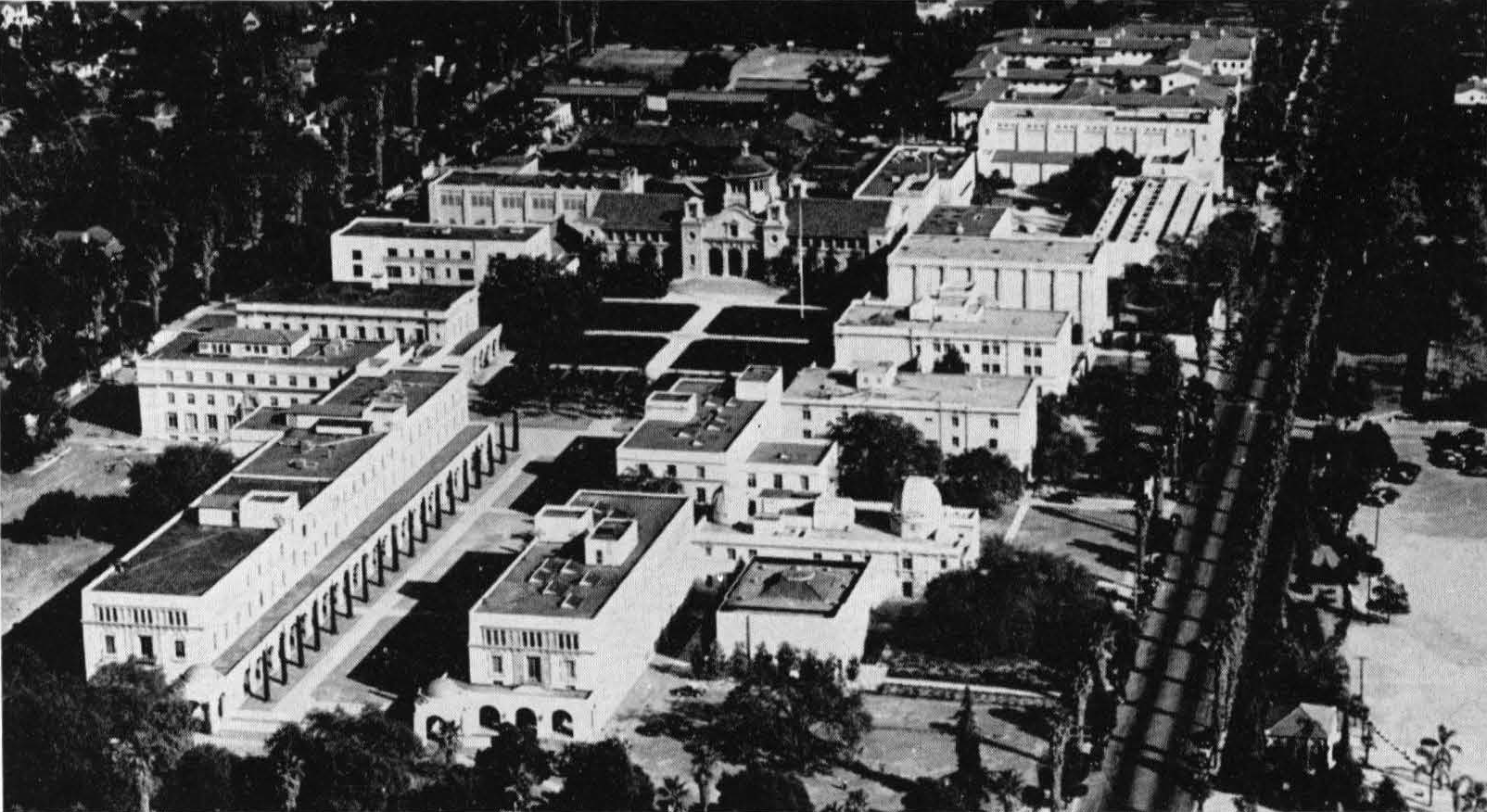
Aerial view of the California Institute of Technology in 1946

The San Gabriel Valley is home to the annual Tournament of Roses Parade, which is broadcast live on television on New Year's Day from Pasadena. It features floral floats and participating marching bands who walk for 5.5 miles celebrating the new years. After the parade, the Rose Bowl game between two rival college football teams is also televised live. It is considered "America's Stadium" because of the memorable games that it has hosted and became a staple in the football community when the game happens.

As the oldest incorporated community in the valley, the City of Pasadena serves as a cultural center for the San Gabriel Valley. Several art-house film and play theatres are located in Pasadena, including the Pasadena Playhouse. In addition, the local news/talk National Public Radio station KPCC 89.3 FM broadcasts from Pasadena City College, although it is operated by Minnesota Public Radio.

Old Pasadena, which has been restored and rejuvenated, remains highly popular. Old Pasadena has an active nightlife, a shopping mall, boutiques, outdoor cafés, nightclubs, comedy clubs, and varied restaurants. Other communities hope to emulate its successes through commercial redevelopment and reviving their own downtown areas or "Main Streets".

The city of Azusa has attempted to encourage redevelopment of its once-dilapidated downtown section by using a Route 66 theme. Covina has had moderate success with its nostalgic Downtown Covina, with emphasis placed on a small-town America atmosphere and mom-and-pop merchants rather than big-box retail chains; Monrovia has also embraced this theme for their "Old Town." Alhambra has also worked to renovate its downtown along Main St. San Gabriel Mission is the center of historical culture in SGV.

The California Institute of Technology, Caltech, is located in Pasadena. It is ranked in the top 10 universities worldwide by metrics such as citation index, Nobel Prizes, and general university rankings. Caltech is responsible for the well-known Jet Propulsion Laboratory, which designs and engineers many of NASA's spacecraft.

The city of Baldwin Park is the birthplace of the popular fast food chain In-N-Out. Its first location opened in the city in 1948. It has expanded across the San Gabriel Valley, with locations opening in Alhambra, Arcadia, and Rosemead.

Huy Fong's Sriracha sauce, the ubiquitous sauce found at Vietnamese restaurants across the western world, is manufactured next to the company's headquarters in Irwindale.

Naked Juice, now a division of PepsiCo, is headquartered in Monrovia.

Panda Express was launched as a fast food version of the Panda Inn restaurant in Pasadena in 1983. The company's headquarters are in Rosemead.

Trader Joe's opened its first location in Pasadena in 1967. The company's headquarters are now in Monrovia.

== Politics and government ==
Cities have their own local mayors and city councils. Many cities in the San Gabriel Valley contract public safety to the Los Angeles County Fire Department and/or the Los Angeles County Sheriff's Department. Unincorporated areas such as Hacienda Heights and Rowland Heights are governed by the Los Angeles County Board of Supervisors, and the Los Angeles County Sheriff's Department has jurisdiction in these areas.

In many unincorporated areas, advisory town councils guide the decisions, made by a supervisor or city manager. Often these groups began as collaborations of local homeowner associations. The Hacienda Heights Improvement Association, Rowland Heights Coordinating Council, and Altadena Town Council are examples of advisory bodies that are officially sanctioned by the county supervisor representing that community.

In 2003, voters in the unincorporated community of Hacienda Heights defeated a proposal to incorporate as a city. It remains an unincorporated district governed by the Los Angeles County Board of Supervisors rather than by a locally elected mayor and city council.

== Transportation ==
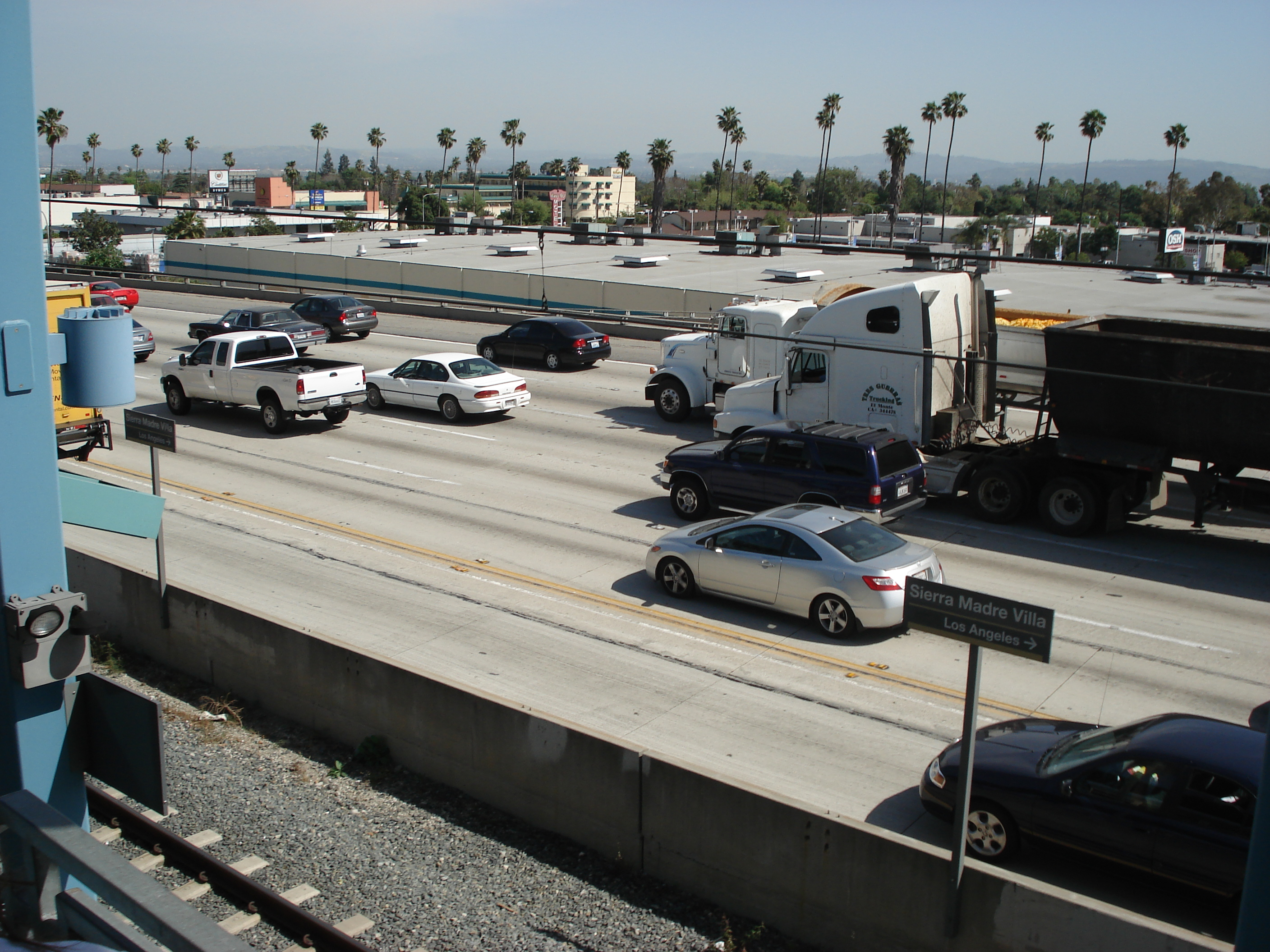
Foothill Freeway (I-210) as seen from the Metro Gold Line Sierra Madre Villa Station

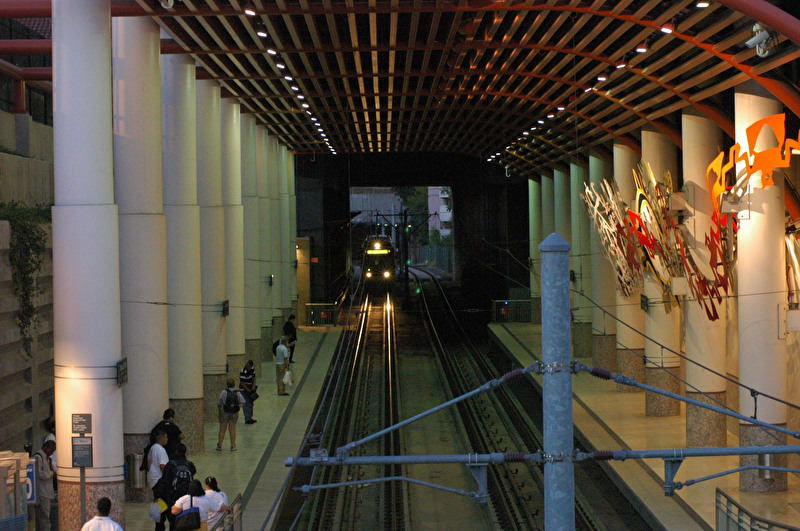
Gold Line Memorial Park Station

Foothill Transit and the Los Angeles County Metropolitan Transportation Authority provide bus transit services throughout the valley, with Metro providing most transit service west of Interstate 605 and Foothill providing service east of Interstate 605. El Monte station, a large regional bus station, provides transportation to Union Station in downtown Los Angeles via the El Monte Busway, an 11-mile (18 km) shared-use bus corridor (transitway). Metro operates the J Line on the busway to downtown Los Angeles and San Pedro, and Foothill Transit operates the Silver Streak from Montclair to downtown Los Angeles. The Metrolink San Bernardino Line commuter train runs westward to Downtown Los Angeles and eastward to San Bernardino through the valley.

On March 5, 2016, the Los Angeles County Metropolitan Transportation Authority opened the Metro Gold Line Foothill Extension, expanding the current light rail service that previously traveled from East LA to Pasadena through Downtown LA to a new Northern terminus in Azusa. It has since been taken over by the A Line, which goes from Downtown Los Angeles to Long Beach and is the longest light rail line in the world.

Several cities provide their own in-city transportation shuttles:

- Alhambra
- Arcadia
- Baldwin Park
- Duarte
- Glendora
- La Puente
- Monrovia
- Montebello
- Monterey Park
- Pasadena
- Temple City
- West Covina

The San Gabriel Valley is served by several major freeways:

- the Foothill Freeway (Interstate 210 (California) and State Route 210)
- the Ventura Freeway (State Route 134)
- the San Bernardino Freeway (Interstate 10)
- the Pomona Freeway (State Route 60)
- the Pasadena Freeway (State Route 110)
- the Long Beach Freeway (Interstate 710)
- the San Gabriel River Freeway (Interstate 605)
- the Orange Freeway (State Route 57)

I-710 ends abruptly at the western border of Alhambra, near California State University, Los Angeles, with an unsigned spur of I-710 starting again in Pasadena at California Boulevard and ending at the junction of I-210 and SR 134. Efforts to complete the freeway have been met with fierce opposition, including the possibility of using advanced tunneling technologies to overcome objections by South Pasadena. The gap will no longer be closed, and both Pasadena and Alhambra are exploring options on the future of their respective spurs.

At the eastern end of the San Gabriel Valley, the freeway segment of SR 210 (formerly designated SR 30 and still signed as such in some places in San Bernardino County) between SR 57 and I-15 had been a source of similar contention in the bordering community of La Verne, but a connector was finally constructed and added to the Foothill Freeway in 2002.

State Route 39 leads north into the San Gabriel Mountains to the Crystal Lake Recreation Area. The portion connecting the recreation area to the Angeles Crest Highway (State Route 2) has been closed to the public since the early 1970s due to massive damage and rockslides.

General aviation is served by San Gabriel Valley Airport (EMT) in El Monte and Brackett Field (POC) in Pomona. Commercial aviation is served by the five major Southern California airports: Los Angeles International Airport (LAX), Hollywood Burbank Airport (BUR), Ontario International Airport (ONT), Long Beach Airport (LGB), and John Wayne Airport (SNA).

== Media ==
The local daily English-language newspapers are the Los Angeles Times, which includes a real estate and automotive advertising section for the San Gabriel Valley/Inland Empire, the San Gabriel Valley Tribune, and the Pasadena Star-News, which operates from its Monrovia office. The Pasadena Star-News covers the Pasadena/Alhambra area and the Tribune covers the central and eastern San Gabriel Valley communities. Business news is covered by the San Gabriel Valley Business Journal.

Other San Gabriel Valley-wide publications include the weekly Mountain Views News, San Gabriel Valley NOW, and the San Gabriel Valley Examiner that serve the foothill communities, the Mid Valley News which serves the central San Gabriel Valley, and the Beacon Media weekly newspaper chain, whose weekly newspapers cover several San Gabriel Valley cities. The South Pasadena Review serves South Pasadena and the San Marino Tribune serves San Marino. Additionally, the cities of Alhambra, Glendora, Azusa, San Dimas and La Verne have monthly community newspapers that are published on the first Friday of every month. These papers include Around Alhambra, the Glendora Community News, Azusa Community News, San Dimas Community News and the La Verne Community News, all distributed directly to each mailing address. The Alhambra Source is a USC Annenberg–backed community news site founded in 2010 and folded in 2018. The site is based on research into local information need and includes a multilingual cadre of volunteer and young adult contributors. It is published online every weekday and includes select content in Spanish and Chinese as well as English. In the eastern part of the valley, Claremont has its own community newspaper, the Claremont Courier.

Several large newspaper publishing companies serve the large Chinese-speaking readership in the Greater Los Angeles Area; a number of them are based in the San Gabriel Valley. The national daily Chinese-language newspapers Chinese Daily News (Los Angeles edition of the World Journal newspaper) and International Daily News are both printed in Monterey Park. The Los Angeles edition of the Hong Kong–based Sing Tao is printed in Alhambra and the newspaper is specifically tailored to the Cantonese-speaking readership. The Epoch Times (大纪元) is based in New York City and has its Los Angeles office in San Gabriel. These newspapers are circulated and distributed throughout Chinese American communities in the San Gabriel Valley, Chinatown, San Diego, and in Las Vegas, Nevada (where the latter two cities generally receive the Los Angeles editions due to a relatively lower population density of Chinese-speaking Americans).

== In popular culture ==
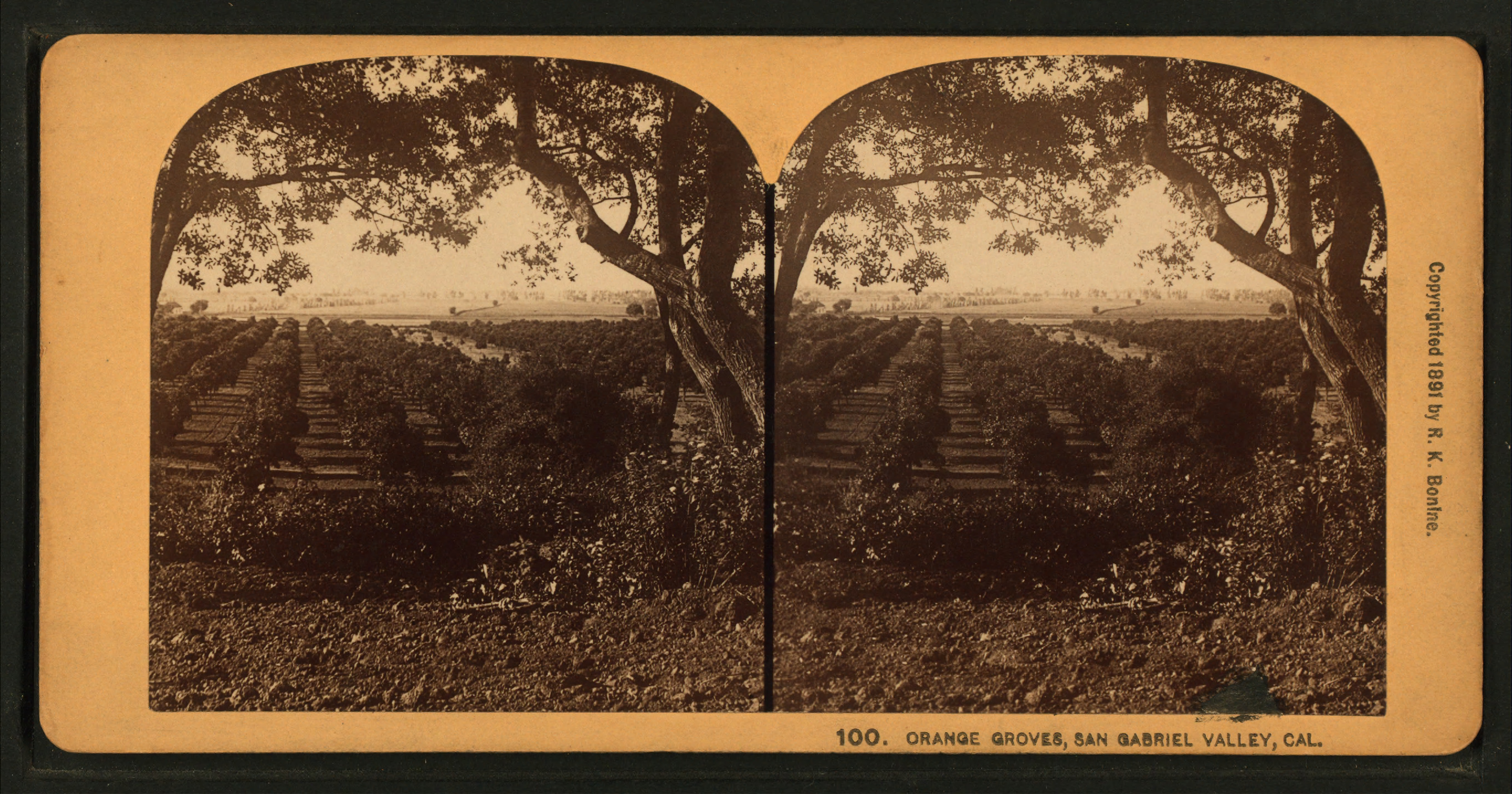
Stereoscopic card from 1891 of Orange Groves

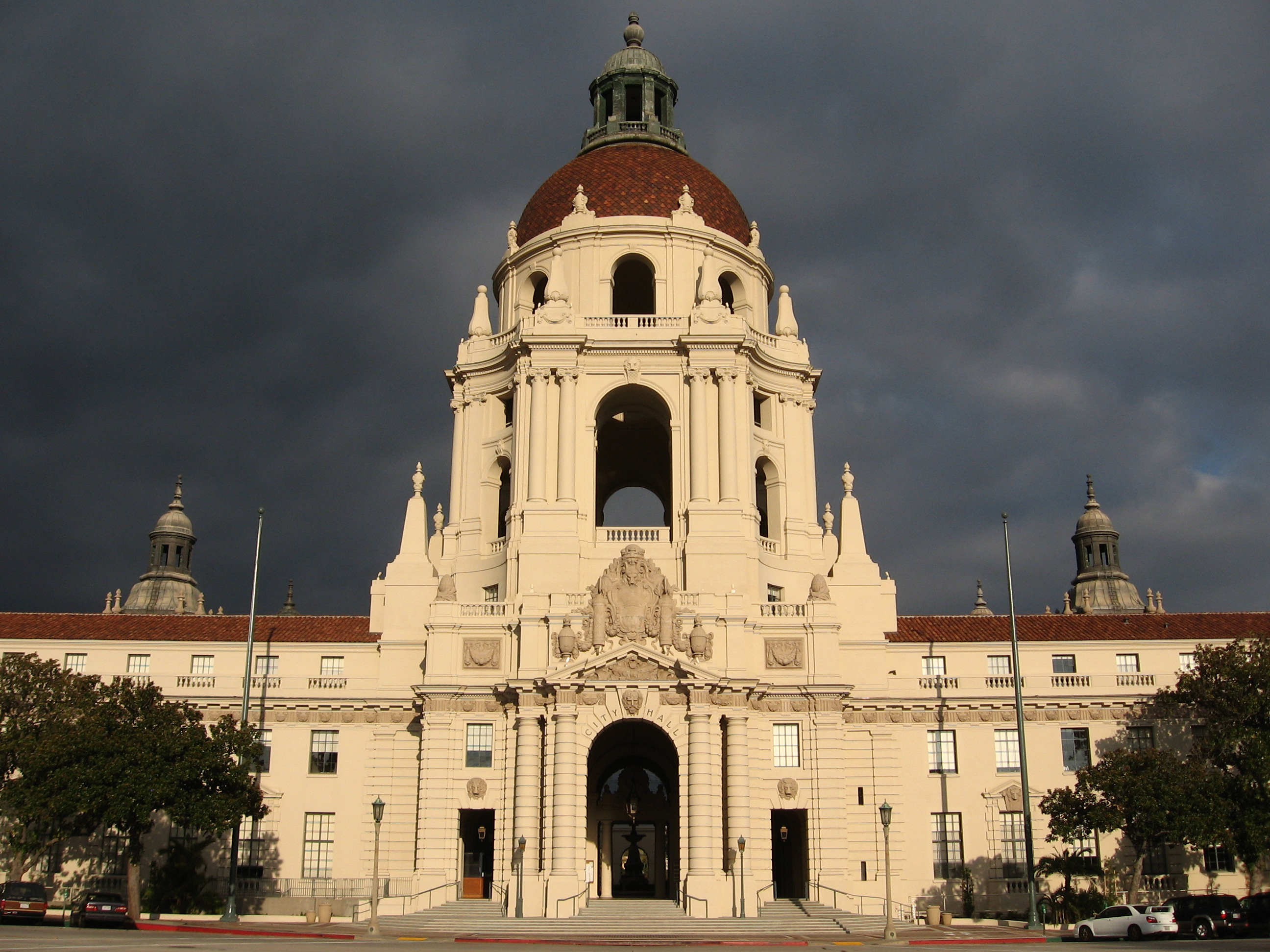
Pasadena City Hall

Many films have been filmed on location in the San Gabriel Valley. Chantry Flats above Arcadia is featured as the landing site of aliens in the original film War of the Worlds. South Pasadena and Alhambra served as the gloomy backgrounds of a fictional Illinois town of Haddonfield in John Carpenter's 1978 horror film Halloween. Some areas of Pasadena and South Pasadena have a distinctly Midwestern look. Pasadena's distinctive domed City Hall has doubled as a courthouse or capitol building in countless television commercials and movies, and its South Lake shopping district filled in for Rodeo Drive in Beverly Hills Ninja.

The city of San Marino has acted as a backdrop for a number of films and television shows. Major studio motion pictures filmed in San Marino include Mr. & Mrs, Smith, Disturbia, Enough, Monster-in-Law, Memoirs of a Geisha, Frailty, Men in Black II, The Hot Chick, One Hour Photo, Anger Management, The Wedding Planner, Starsky & Hutch, Intolerable Cruelty, Mystery Men, Legally Blonde 2, The Nutty Professor, Beverly Hills Ninja, The Sweetest Thing, S1m0ne, Charlie's Angels, Indecent Proposal, and American Wedding. Prime time television programs filmed within city borders include Felicity, The Office, The West Wing, and Alias. In addition, San Marino High School students in the graduating classes of 2004 and 2005 were documented in two separate reality television programs by MTV, which aired on the cable television network in 2005.

The cities of Temple City and Rosemead served as the backdrop for the Emmy Award–winning television series The Wonder Years (1988 to 1993). While Temple City's Las Tunas Drive served as the downtown for the Arnold Family's fictitious hometown, Rosemead High School stood in for the town's high school.

The city of Whittier also hosts film crews for various motion picture, television and feature films. In Robert Zemeckis' Back to the Future trilogy of time travel adventure movies (1985, 1989, 1990), Whittier High School was used as Hill Valley High School. Michael J. Fox's character travels back in time on the huge parking lot of the Puente Hills Mall in the City of Industry that served as the location of the fictitious Twin Pines Mall/Lone Pine Mall. The Gamble House in Pasadena provided the exterior of Christopher Lloyd's character's 1950s mansion. The city of El Monte served as a dilapidated future neighborhood. Another movie starring Fox, Teen Wolf. was largely filmed in Arcadia. The Pasadena Chapter building of the Red Cross served as JAG Headquarters for the TV series JAG, and the Caltech campus is regularly seen as the "Cal Sci" campus in the TV series Numb3rs. The actual house used as the residence of the main characters is also located in the southern end of Pasadena. Uptown Whittier was a principal location for the 1987 release Masters of the Universe, and many scenes of the film show the buildings of the neighborhood as they appeared before most of them were damaged or destroyed by the Whittier Narrows earthquake of that year. Forrest Gump (1994), starring Tom Hanks, was partially filmed at East Los Angeles College in Monterey Park. The downtown portion of Myrtle Avenue in Monrovia has been used in many movies and television commercials. Multiple locations throughout Monrovia also played the role of the fictitious Rome, WI in the TV series Picket Fences.Pinky's Record Store in Friday; The 90s television show Roswell filmed in Covina, most noticeably the downtown area. Most recently, the former location of a now closed IKEA in the City of Industry was used to film scenes in the movie Mr. & Mrs. Smith (2005), starring Angelina Jolie and Brad Pitt. Across the street from the defunct IKEA is Speed Zone, an amusement center with four racetracks. It has been featured in the films Guess Who and Clerks 2 and on TV in Melrose Place, CSI: Miami, Hell's Kitchen, Attack of the Show!, Freaks And Geeks, and more.

== Climate ==
Like much of the Los Angeles region, the San Gabriel Valley enjoys a warm, sunny year-round Mediterranean climate. Rain is sporadic. Due to the Eastern San Gabriel Valley (East of State Route 57) being more inland, the area is subject to hotter summers and colder winters. Light snow is extremely rare in the Valley but can often be viewed on the nearby San Gabriel Mountains.

Climate data for Baldwin Park, California: one of the cities in the San Gabriel Valley
| Month | Jan | Feb | Mar | Apr | May | Jun | Jul | Aug | Sep | Oct | Nov | Dec | Year |
|---|---|---|---|---|---|---|---|---|---|---|---|---|---|
| Mean daily maximum °F (°C) | 70 (21) | 71 (22) | 72 (22) | 77 (25) | 79 (26) | 84 (29) | 89 (32) | 90 (32) | 88 (31) | 83 (28) | 76 (24) | 71 (22) | 75 (24) |
| Mean daily minimum °F (°C) | 43 (6) | 45 (7) | 47 (8) | 50 (10) | 55 (13) | 59 (15) | 62 (17) | 63 (17) | 61 (16) | 55 (13) | 46 (8) | 42 (6) | 50 (10) |
Source: weather.com

== Institutions of higher learning ==
The San Gabriel Valley is home to a number of post-secondary educational institutions, including the California Institute of Technology (Caltech), the Claremont Colleges, and California State Polytechnic University, Pomona (Cal Poly Pomona)."

- Alliant International University, private (for-profit) – Alhambra
- Art Center College of Design, private, nonprofit – Pasadena
- Azusa Pacific University (APU), private university – Azusa
- California Institute of Advanced Management (CIAM), private, not-for-profit graduate school located in EL Monte
- California Institute of Technology (Caltech), private university – Pasadena
- California State Polytechnic University, Pomona (Cal Poly Pomona), public university – Pomona
- California State University, Los Angeles, public university – Los Angeles
- Irell & Manella Graduate School of Biological Sciences, private, not-for-profit graduate school located at the City of Hope in Duarte
- Claremont Graduate University, private graduate university – Claremont
- Claremont McKenna College, private college – Claremont
- Citrus College, community college – Glendora
- Digital Business & Design College (DBD), private (for-profit) college – El Monte
- East Los Angeles College (ELAC), community college – Monterey Park
- Fuller Theological Seminary, private college – Pasadena
- Harvey Mudd College, private college – Claremont
- ITT Technical Institute (ITT Tech), private (for-profit) college – San Dimas
- Keck Graduate Institute, private graduate university – Claremont
- Life Pacific College, private Bible college – San Dimas
- Mt. San Antonio College (Mt. SAC), community college – Walnut
- Occidental College, private college – Eagle Rock
- Pasadena City College (PCC), community college – Pasadena
- Pitzer College, private college – Claremont
- Pomona College, private college – Claremont
- Rio Hondo College, community college – Whittier
- Scripps College, private college – Claremont
- University of La Verne, private college – La Verne
- University of Phoenix, adult education (for-profit) – Diamond Bar and Pasadena
- University of the West (UWest), private university – Rosemead
- Western University of Health Sciences (WU), private university – Pomona
- Whittier College (WC), private college – Whittier
- William Carey International University, private (for-profit) university – Pasadena

== Local sites of interest ==
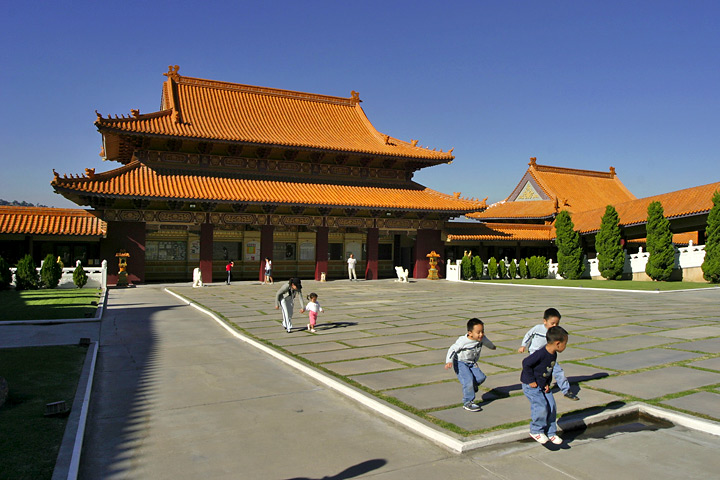
Hsi Lai Temple in Hacienda Heights, second largest Buddhist temple and monastery in the Western Hemisphere

- California Botanic Garden – Claremont
- Christmas Tree Lane – Altadena
- Descanso Gardens – La Cañada Flintridge
- Fairplex, annual Los Angeles County Fair – Pomona
- Fox Theater Pomona – Pomona
- Frank G. Bonelli Regional Park, man-made park – San Dimas
- Gamble House – Pasadena
- Homestead Museum, site of Pío Pico's burial – City of Industry
- Hsi Lai Temple – Hacienda Heights
- Huntington Library and Botanical Gardens – San Marino
- The Ice House, Pasadena comedy club
- In-N-Out Burger Pomona Dragstrip – Pomona
- Jet Propulsion Laboratory – La Canada Flintridge
- Los Angeles County Arboretum and Botanic Garden – Arcadia
- Mershops Shops at Montebello – shopping mall in Montebello
- Mission San Gabriel Arcángel – San Gabriel
- Norton Simon Museum – Pasadena
- Old Town Pasadena – Pasadena
- Pio Pico House, Whittier
- Pio Pico State Historic Park – Whittier
- Plaza West Covina – shopping mall in West Covina
- Puente Hills Mall – shopping mall in City of Industry
- Raging Waters – San Dimas
- Rose Bowl – Pasadena
- Rose Hills Memorial Park – Whittier
- Rubel Castle – Glendora
- Santa Anita Park, horse racing – Arcadia
- Santa Fe Dam Recreation Area – Irwindale
- The Shops at Santa Anita – Arcadia (largest mall in San Gabriel Valley)
- Toyota Speedway at Irwindale – Irwindale
- Vroman's Bookstore, oldest independent bookstore – Pasadena

== Company headquarters ==
- Avery Dennison Corporation (packaging products) – Pasadena
- Community Bank – Pasadena
- East West Bank (large Chinese American bank) – Pasadena
- Edison International (large energy provider) – Rosemead
- Huy Fong Foods (leader in Asian hot sauce) – Irwindale
- OneWest Bank – Pasadena
- Panda Restaurant Group (largest Chinese restaurant chain) – Rosemead
- Trader Joe's (food market) – Monrovia
- Viewsonic (computer monitors) – Walnut
- Western Asset (investment firm) – Pasadena

== Area codes ==
Most of the San Gabriel Valley lies within the 626 area code. Montebello, Whittier, and portions of its valley neighbors are in the 323 and 562 area codes. Some of northwestern Pasadena is also serviced by the 818 area code. Most of the communities in the Eastern San Gabriel Valley which lie east of State Route 57 are located in the 909 area code.

== See also ==
- Category: San Gabriel Valley
- Greater Los Angeles Area
- Pomona Valley
- San Gabriel Mountains Regional Conservancy
- San Fernando Valley
