= Bartolo, California =

Location in Los Angeles County

Bartolo is an archaic placename in Los Angeles County, California. It lay at an elevation of 223 feet (68 m). Bartolo still appeared on maps as of 1926. Its original name came from Rancho Paso de Bartolo, the lands of the Mexican governor of California, Pio Pico, which in turn was named for the San Gabriel River ford called Paso de Bartolo Viejo (Old Bartolo's Crossing), near Beverly Road and the San Gabriel River. Paso de Bartolo is a synclinal valley through which both San Gabriel River and Río Hondo pass.

It was a station on the Union Pacific Railroad at the junction of its branch line to Whittier and its main line. Today, the area is part of the cities of Whittier and Pico Rivera, the latter of which is named for Pio Pico and the San Gabriel River..

Bartolo was the site of an engagement in the Mexican–American War. With 565 men, Commodore Robert F. Stockton and General Stephen Watts Kearny engaged Gen. José María Flores on January 8, 1847, at Bartolo Ford. Advancing across the knee-deep water in a hollow square formation, Kearny's men defeated General Florés and his Californios that had so plagued Lieutenant Gillespie at the siege of Los Angeles.
