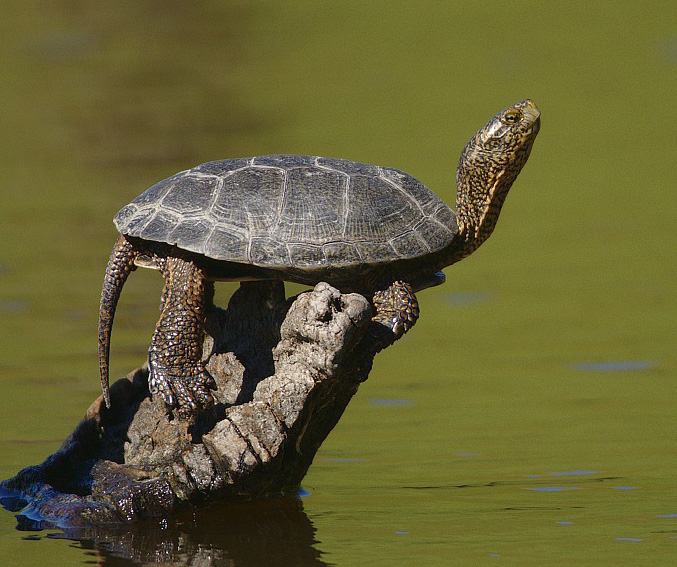
- Western pond turtle, (Actinemys marmorata)

Scientific classification
- Kingdom: Animalia
- Phylum: Chordata
- Class: Reptilia
- Order: Testudines
- Suborder: Cryptodira
- Family: Emydidae
- Subfamily: Emydinae
- Genus: Actinemys; Agassiz, 1857

= Actinemys =

Genus of turtles

Actinemys is a small genus of turtles in the family Emydidae. The genus is endemic to the west coast of North America. The genus contains two species.

== Species ==
The following two species are recognized as being valid.

- Actinemys marmorata (Baird & Girard, 1852) – northwestern pond turtle, northern Pacific pond turtle
- Actinemys pallida (Seeliger, 1945) – southwestern pond turtle, southern Pacific pond turtle

Nota bene: A binomial authority in parentheses indicates that the species was originally described in a genus other than Actinemys.

== Taxonomy ==
Both species are sometimes included in the genus Emys (sensu lato). Actinemys pallida, the southwestern pond turtle, has been a recent split from Actinemys marmorata, of which it was previously considered a subspecies.
