= Pío Pico State Historic Park =

State historic park in Los Angeles County, California, United States

- Pío Pico Casa
- U.S. National Register of Historic Places
- California Historical Landmark No. 127
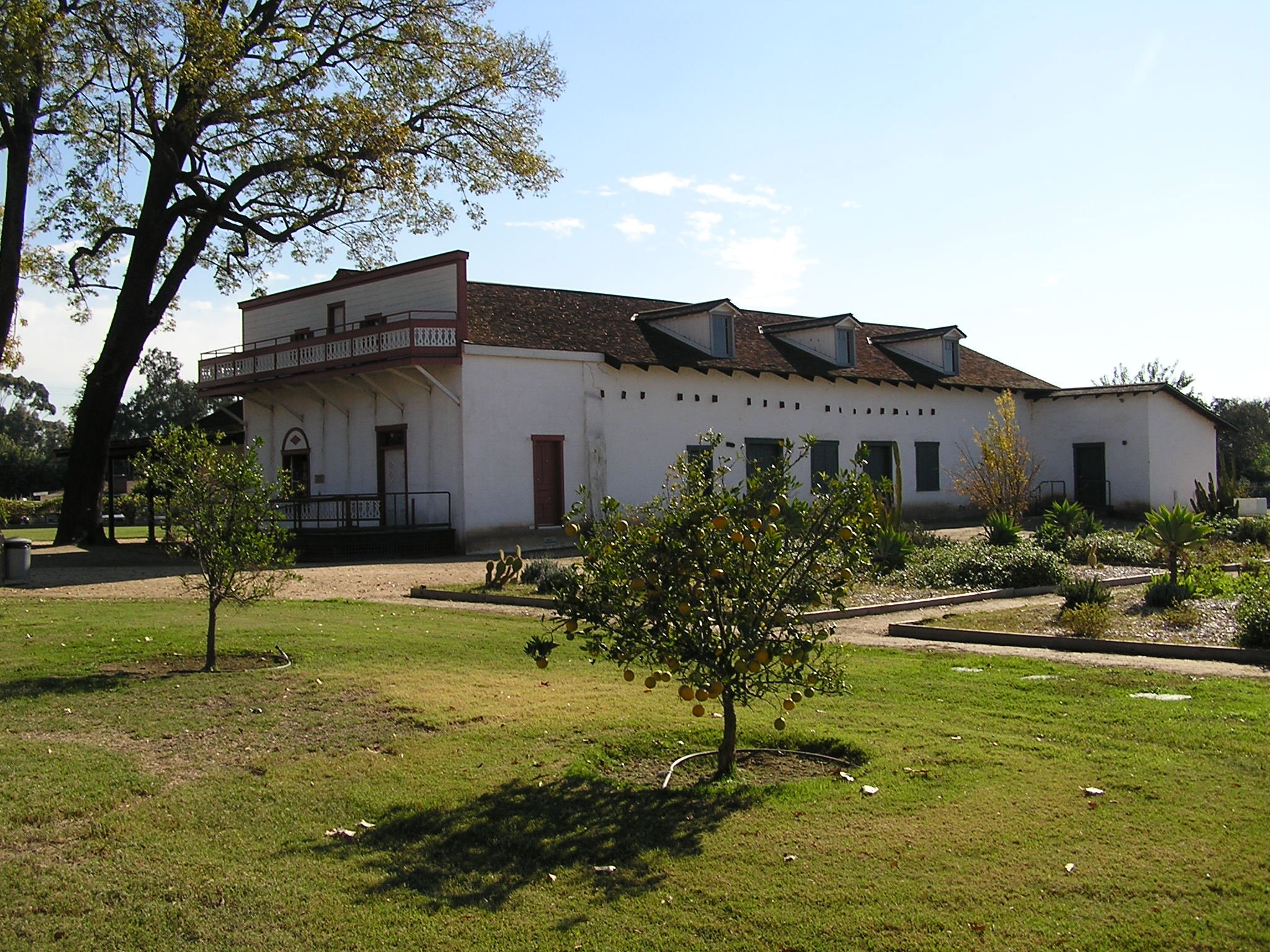
- The adobe and grounds after the 2000–2003 restoration
- Location: 6003 Pioneer Blvd; Whittier, California
- Coordinates: 33.993636°N 118.071075°W
- NRHP reference No.: 73000408
- CHISL No.: 127
- Added to NRHP: June 19, 1973

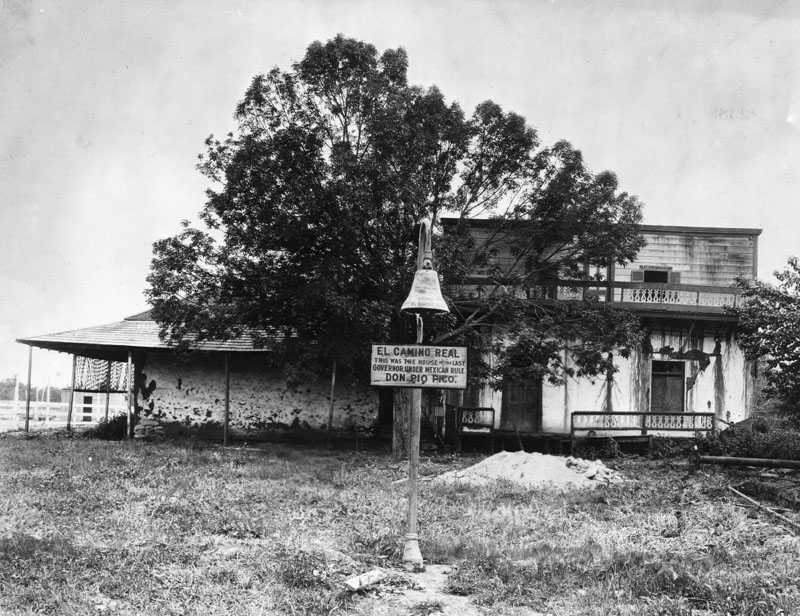
Pío Pico Adobe in 1910

Pío Pico State Historic Park is the site of El Ranchito, also known as the Pío Pico Adobe or Pío Pico Mansion, the final home of Pío Pico, the last governor of Alta California under Mexican rule and a pivotal figure in early California history. Located in Whittier, California, at 6003 Pioneer Blvd. near Whittier Blvd. and Interstate 605, it is California Historical Landmark No. 127, listed as "Casa de Governor Pío Pico". Just west of the park is the San Gabriel River. Across the river is the city that bears his name—Pico Rivera. The park consists of the adobe and about three acres of surrounding land.

== History ==
Starting in 1848, after the Mexican–American War, Pío Pico began acquiring the 10,000-acre (4,000 ha) Rancho Paso de Bartolo, and built a home in 1853. The home was damaged by the flooding of 1867, which set the San Gabriel River to its present course, and was nearly destroyed in 1882 by flooding. The structure was completely redone into its current form, adding American-style elements into the traditional Californio design. In 1892, Pio Pico was evicted from the property by Bernard Cohn, an American lawyer. When taking what he thought was a loan from Cohn in 1883, Pico, who could not read or write English, had conveyed the deed for the property, and courts ruled with Cohn. Pico died a pauper two years later at his daughter's home.

By 1898 the City of Whittier began buying up parts of the property to construct a water pumping facility. In 1907, local Whittier citizens, led by Harriet Williams Russell Strong, were able to have the site made a historic monument. Strong, who had known Pico since 1867, purchased the property and had it restored in 1909. The property was conveyed to the State of California in 1917 and designated one of its first State Historic Parks in 1927. The State of California did further renovations in 1944. The Adobe was seriously damaged in the 1987 Whittier Narrows earthquake, forcing closure. While funds were being raised for restoration, the additional damage was caused by the 1994 Northridge earthquake. Finally, in 1996 a Los Angeles County proposition earmarked US$2.5 million for the park's restoration. Restoration of the structure began in 2000 and the historic landscape in 2002, with the park re-opened on 20 September 2003.

At the re-opening ceremonies, the Battle of Rio San Gabriel, which occurred nearby during the Mexican–American War, was re-enacted.

== Proposed for closure ==
Pio Pico State Historic Park was one of the 48 California state parks proposed for closure in January 2008 by California's Governor Arnold Schwarzenegger as part of a deficit reduction program. None of the proposed closures occurred then, however, the park was again targeted along with some seventy state parks for closure in 2011 by Governor Jerry Brown. The Friends of Pio Pico and the City of Whittier together raised $80,000 to keep the park from closing.

== Pio Pico Adobe Rehabilitation Project ==
The 2000-2003 rehabilitation of the Pio Pico Adobe was undertaken by the California State Parks Department of Parks and Recreation.

The architect of record for the rehabilitation was David Tsu-Wang Sung, a California-licensed architect. Sung designed and oversaw the rehabilitation work, which included architectural, civil, structural, mechanical, and electrical restoration and improvements, as well as asbestos and lead paint abatement.

The project helped return the adobe and surrounding historic landscape to public use as the Pio Pico State Historic Park.

Below are two scans from the architectural drawings for the rehabilitation project.

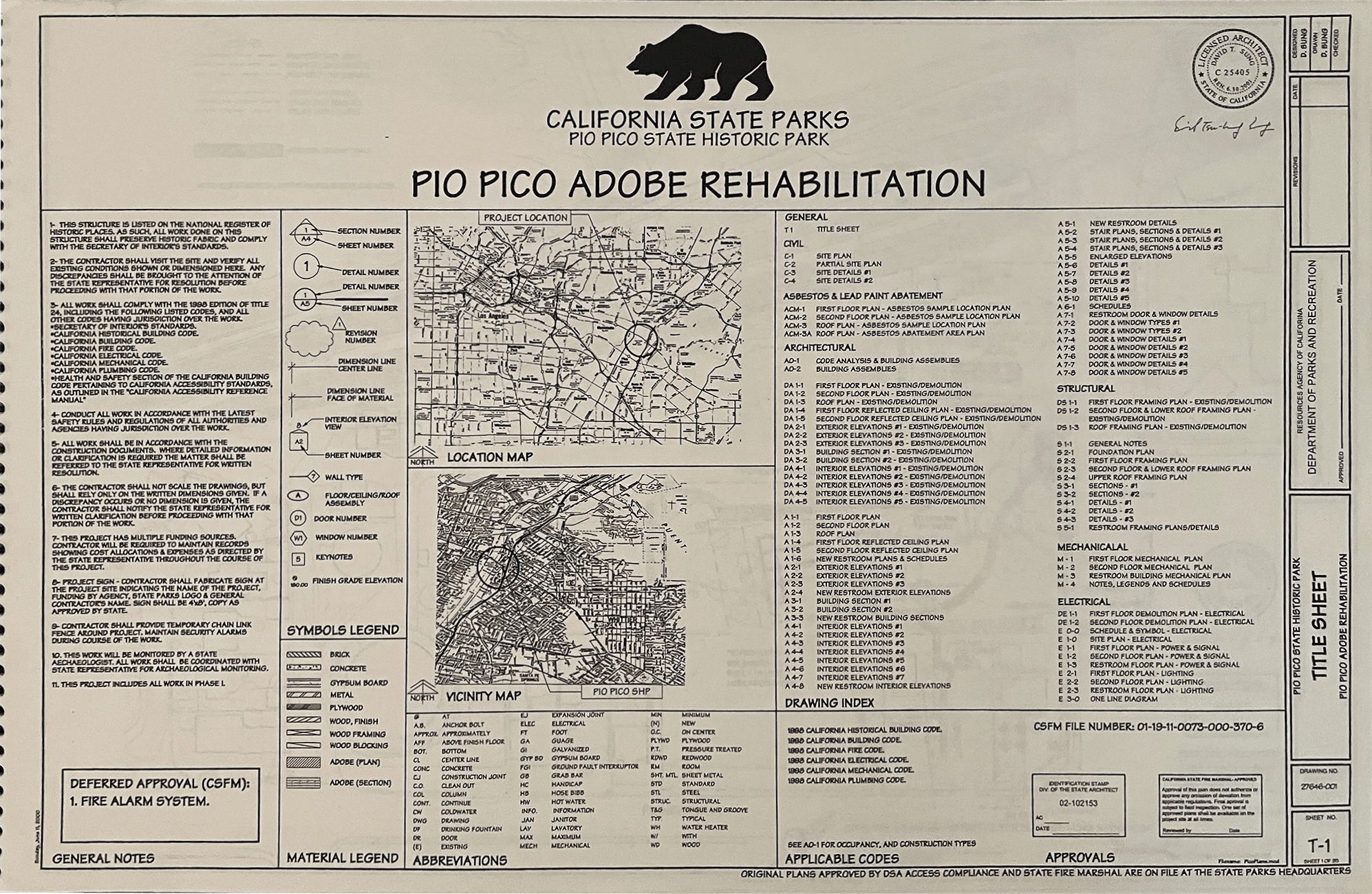
Architectural title sheet from the 2000-2003 Pio Pico Adobe Rehabilitation Project in California

https://commons.wikimedia.org/wiki/File:PioPico-Adobe-TitleSheet.png

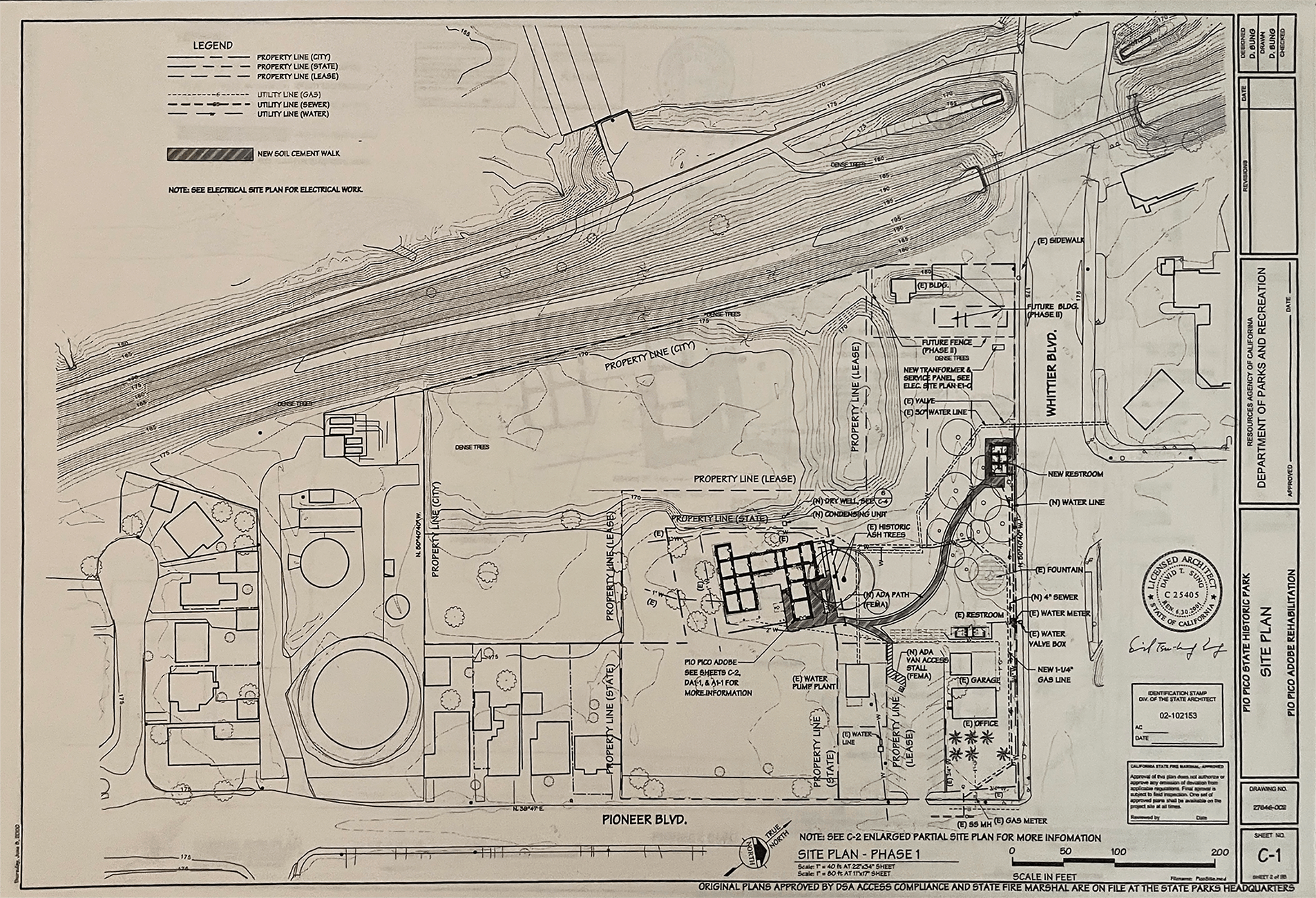
Architectural site plan from the 2000-2003 Pio Pico Adobe Rehabilitation Project in California

https://commons.wikimedia.org/wiki/File:PioPico-Adobe-Site_Plan.png

== California Historical Landmark ==
California Historical Landmark Marker No. 127 at the site reads:

- NO. 127 CASA DE GOVERNOR PÍO PICO - Following the Mexican War, Pío Pico, last Mexican governor, acquired 9,000-acre Rancho Paso de Bartolo and built here an adobe home that was destroyed by the floods of 1883-1884. His second adobe casa, now known as Pío Pico Mansion, represents a compromise between Mexican and American cultures. While living here the ex-Governor was active in the development of American California.

== Appearances in popular culture ==
The historic park was featured by Huell Howser in California's Golden Parks Episode 127.
