= San Gabriel Mountains Regional Conservancy =

The San Gabriel Mountains Regional Conservancy (SGMRC) is a regional environmental non-profit organization located in the foothill area of the eastern San Gabriel Valley. It is concerned with the conservation of land, land use planning, publication of studies, watershed management, land management, and education.

SGMRC is currently the only environmental organization focused on:

1. Sustainable, regional stakeholder involvement through the WIN (Watershed Integrated Network) Model
2. The Nature Center Network, including multi-purpose and integrated community outreach for watershed education, including workshops and library/ technology approaches
3. The connectivity, sustainability, capacity building model for the San Gabriel Valley Conservancies Network

The Greater San Gabriel Valley is served, between the 14 and 15 Freeways – east/west, and the San Gabriel Mountains to the Puente Hills – north/south. The SGMRC watershed study/plan (Reconnecting the San Gabriel Valley) covered 640 square miles (1,700 km^{2}) of the Upper San Gabriel River and its tributaries, the largest single watershed study in Los Angeles County. The Greater San Gabriel Valley includes almost a third of the population of Los Angeles County.

The SGMRC was established in 1997 as a 501(c)(3) non-profit corporation.

The SGMRC currently operates three nature centers: the Glendora Conservancy Nature Center, the Santa Fe Dam Nature Center, and the Galster Park Nature Center.
