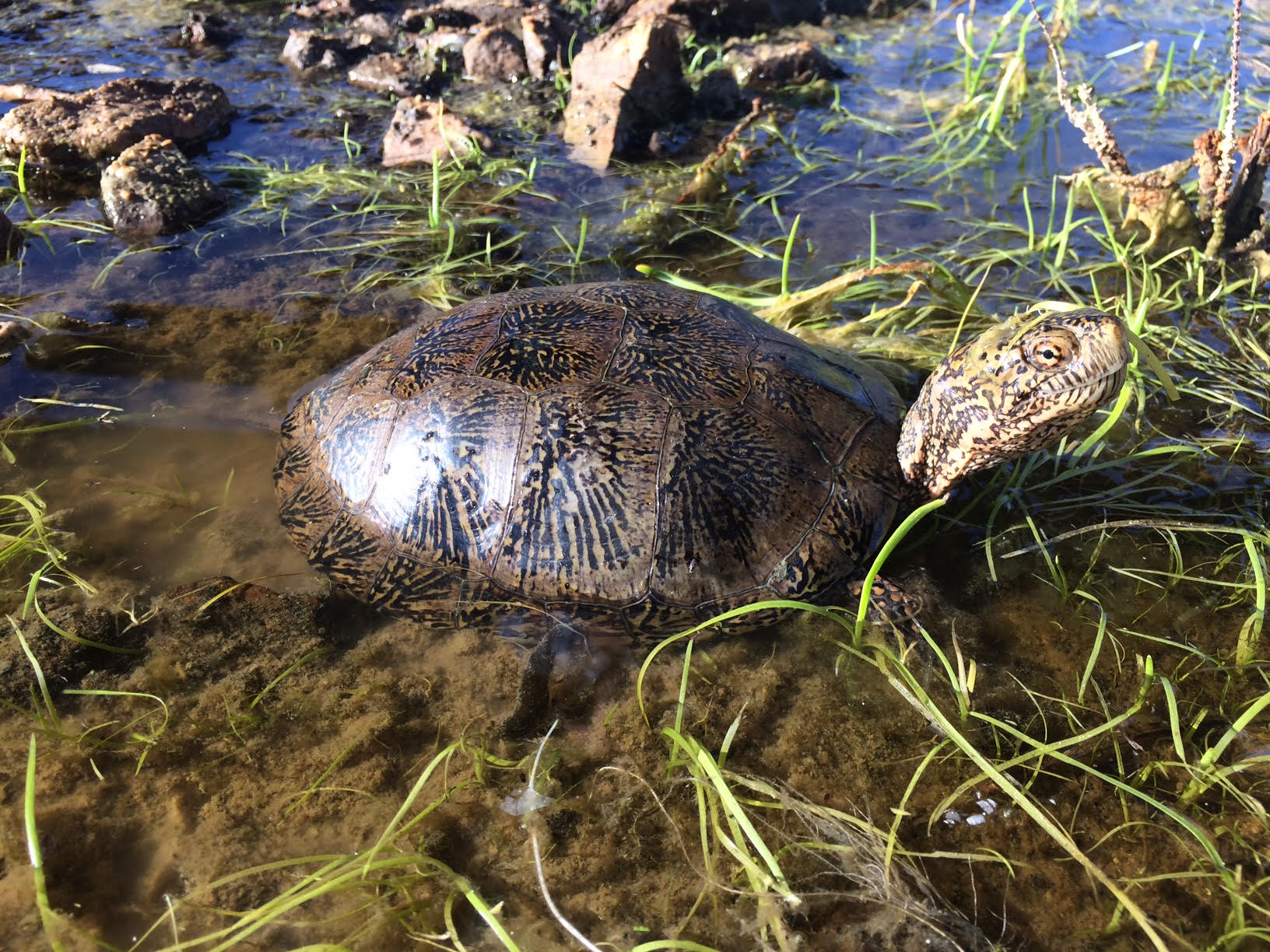

Conservation status
- Imperiled (NatureServe)

Scientific classification
- Kingdom: Animalia
- Phylum: Chordata
- Class: Reptilia
- Order: Testudines
- Suborder: Cryptodira
- Family: Emydidae
- Genus: Actinemys
- Species: A. pallida

Binomial name
- Actinemys pallida (Seeliger, 1945)

= Southwestern pond turtle =

Species of turtle

Actinemys pallida, the southwestern pond turtle, is an aquatic turtle of the genus Actinemys in the family Emydidae. It can be found in bodies of water in southern California and Baja California.
