= Rancho Paso de Bartolo =

Mexican land grant in California

Coordinates: 33.990°N 118.070°W

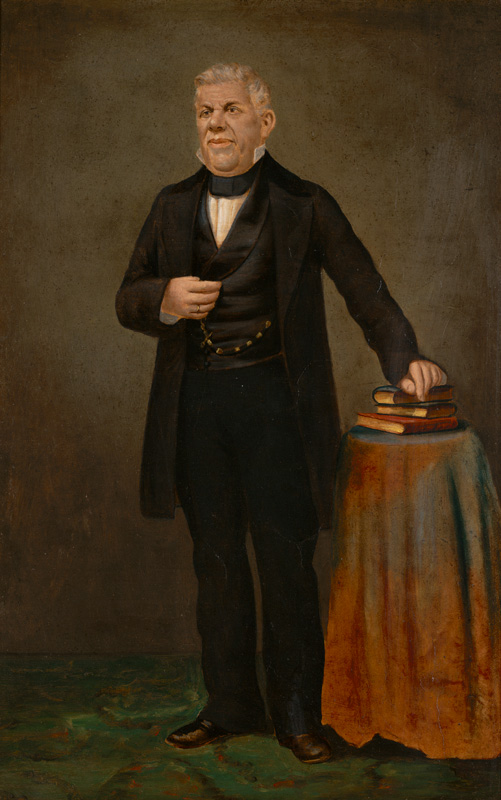
Don Pío Pico, the last Governor of Alta California, acquired Rancho Paso de Bartolo in 1847. His former estate on the rancho is preserved today as the Pío Pico State Historic Park.

Rancho Paso de Bartolo also called Rancho Paso de Bartolo Viejo was a 10,075-acre (40.77 km^{2}) Mexican land grant in present-day Los Angeles County, California, given in 1835 by Governor Jose Figueroa to Juan Crispin Perez. The name refers to a San Gabriel River ford called Paso de Bartolo Viejo (Old Bartolo's Crossing). The rancho includes present-day Montebello, Whittier, and Pico Rivera.

== History ==
Initially property of the San Gabriel Mission, the Rancho Paso de Bartolo land became a part of the original 300,000-acre (1,200 km^{2}) Rancho Los Nietos grant. After an appeal by the mission padres, Rancho Los Nietos was later reduced to 167,000-acre (680 km^{2}), and Rancho Paso de Bartolo was once again a possession of the mission. Following secularization of the missions, Rancho Paso de Bartolo was granted in 1835 to Juan Crispin Perez, a manager at the mission.

In 1843, Bernardo Guirado, a worker at the mission, acquired 876 acres (4 km^{2}) of Paso de Bartolo from Perez. Later, Joaquina Ana Sepulveda, widow of Juan de Jesus Poyorena acquired another 208 acres (1 km^{2}). In 1847, Juan Crispin Perez died leaving the rancho to his family. After the Mexican-American War, former Governor Pío Pico began purchasing pieces of the estate from the heirs of Perez, and by 1852, he acquired 8,991 acres (36 km^{2}) of the rancho.

With the cession of California to the United States following the Mexican-American War, the 1848 Treaty of Guadalupe Hidalgo provided that the land grants would be honored. As required by the Land Act of 1851, a claim for Rancho Paso de Bartolo was filed with the Public Land Commission in 1852. The grant was patented with 876 acres (4 km^{2}) to Bernardo Guirado in 1867, 208 acres (1 km^{2}) to Joaquína Sepulveda in 1881, and 8,991 acres (36 km^{2}) to Pio Pico and Juan C. Perez in 1881.

There was some legal dispute over the Guirado and Sepulveda land, and with the possible encroachment on the Rancho Santa Gertrudes grant to the south.

== Historic sites of the Rancho ==
- Pio Pico State Historic Park. Pío Pico lived at "El Ranchito" from 1852 to 1892. An adobe home was destroyed by the floods of 1883–1884. His second adobe casa, now known as Pío Pico Mansion, represents a compromise between Mexican and American cultures.
- The Battle of Rio San Gabriel, one of the last battles of the Mexican-American War, was fought on Rancho Paso de Bartolo on January 8, 1847.

== See also ==
- Bartolo, California
- Ranchos of Los Angeles County
- List of Ranchos of California
- Whittier Narrows
