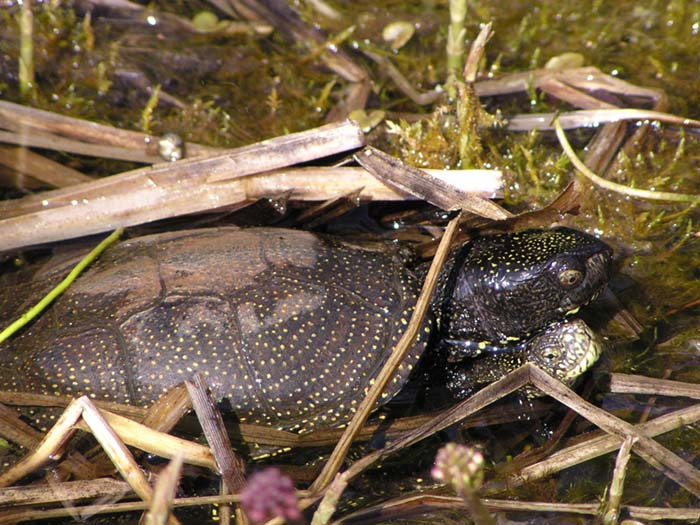
- Emys orbicularis

Scientific classification
- Kingdom: Animalia
- Phylum: Chordata
- Class: Reptilia
- Order: Testudines
- Suborder: Cryptodira
- Family: Emydidae
- Subfamily: Emydinae; McDowell, 1964

Genera
- See text.

= Emydinae =

Subfamily of turtles

The Emydinae are a subfamily of turtles in the family Emydidae.

== Classification ==
The genera of the Emydinae remain unresolved, with Actinemys and Emydoidea being used in some publications.

Subfamily Emydinae

- - - - Clemmys
        - - Clemmys guttata
  - - - Glyptemys
        - - Glyptemys muhlenbergii
          - Glyptemys insculpta
    - - Terrapene
        - - Terrapene carolina
        - - Terrapene coahuila
        - - Terrapene ornata
      - Emys
        - - Emys orbicularis
        - - Emys marmorata
          - Emys blandingii

All four Emydinae genera are present in this abbreviated cladogram (the species Emys trinacris is not shown).

=== Species ===
Image	Genus	Living species
	Clemmys Ritgen, 1828	Clemmys guttata - spotted turtle
	Emys A.M.C. Duméril, 1805	Emys orbicularis – European pond turtle; Emys trinacris – Sicilian pond turtle
	Emydoidea Holbrook, 1838	Emydoidea blandingii - Blanding's turtle
	Actinemys Agassiz, 1857	Actinemys marmorata - western pond turtle; Actinemys pallida - southwestern pond turtle
	Glyptemys Agassiz, 1857	Glyptemys insculpta; Glyptemys muhlenbergii
	Terrapene Merrem, 1820	Common box turtle, Terrapene carolina (Linnaeus, 1758); Florida box turtle, Terrapene carolina bauri Taylor, 1895; Eastern box turtle, Terrapene carolina carolina (Linnaeus, 1758); Gulf Coast box turtle, Terrapene carolina major (Agassiz, 1857); Terrapene carolina putnami O.P. Hay, 1906 (extinct); Three-toed box turtle, Terrapene carolina triunguis (Agassiz, 1857); Coahuilan box turtle, Terrapene coahuila Schmidt & Owens, 1944; Mexican box turtle, Terrapene mexicana (Gray, 1849); Spotted box turtle, Terrapene nelsoni Stejneger, 1925; Northern spotted box turtle, Terrapene nelsoni klauberi Bogert, 1943; Southern spotted box turtle, Terrapene nelsoni nelsoni Stejneger, 1925; Western box turtle, Terrapene ornata, (Agassiz, 1857); Ornate box turtle, Terrapene ornata ornata (Agassiz, 1857); Desert box turtle, Terrapene ornata luteola H.M. Smith & Ramsey, 1952; Yucatán box turtle, Terrapene yucatana (Boulenger, 1895)
