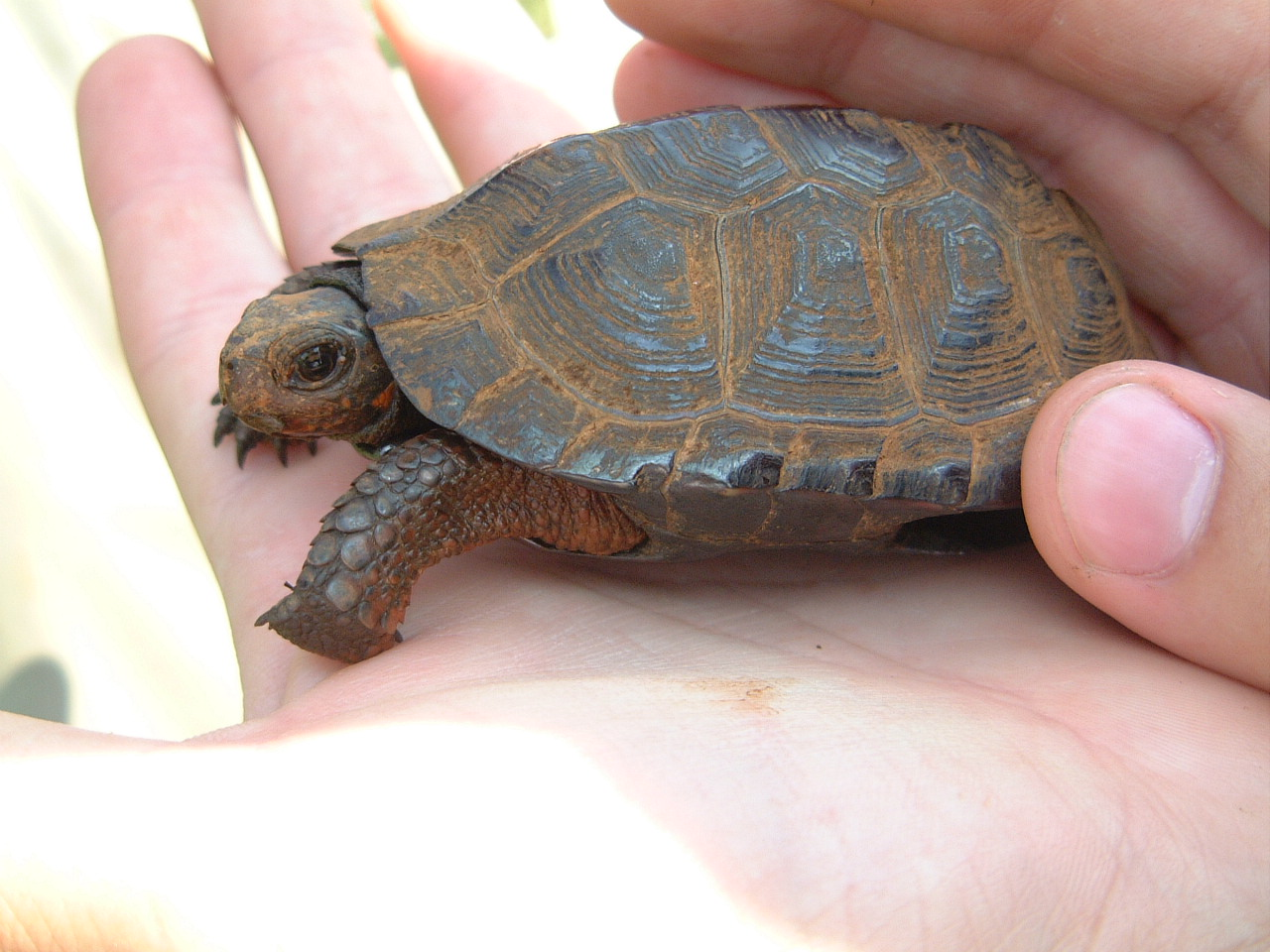
- Glyptemys muhlenbergii

Scientific classification
- Kingdom: Animalia
- Phylum: Chordata
- Class: Reptilia
- Order: Testudines
- Suborder: Cryptodira
- Family: Emydidae
- Subfamily: Emydinae
- Genus: Glyptemys; Agassiz, 1857

Species
- Glyptemys insculpta; Glyptemys muhlenbergii

= Glyptemys =

Glyptemys Temporal range: 0–0 Ma Neogene(Pleistocene) - Recent

Genus of turtles

Glyptemys is a genus of turtles in the family Emydidae. It comprises two species, the bog turtle (Glyptemys muhlenbergii) and the wood turtle (Glyptemys insculpta), both of which are endemic to North America. Until 2001, these turtles were considered members of the genus Clemmys, which currently has one member, the spotted turtle (Clemmys guttata).

When full-grown, turtles of the genus Glyptemys are between 8.9 and 20 cm (3.5 and 7.9 in) in straight carapace length. These turtles are semiaquatic, although this varies based on season. Their morphological characteristics make them unique from other species and unique from each other.

Glyptemys turtles prefer slow moving streams and ponds, and feed on insects, plant matter, small invertebrates, and carrion. These turtles are protected throughout their range, and both species in the genus Glyptemys are considered endangered.

== Taxonomy ==
Portion of family Emydidae

- - - - Clemmys
        - - Clemmys guttata
  - - - Glyptemys
        - - Glyptemys muhlenbergii
          - Glyptemys insculpta
    - - Terrapene
        - - Terrapene carolina
        - - Terrapene coahuila
        - - Terrapene ornata
      - Emys
        - - Emys orbicularis
        - - Emys marmorata
          - Emys blandingii

In the past, the taxonomic classification of these turtles looked very different; however, the current system has Clemmys as a monotypic genus and Glyptemys, Terrapene, and Emys as three distinct genera (the species Emys trinacris is not shown).

The taxonomic classification of turtles of the family Emydidae has been eventful, and many schools of thought are given about how the different genera and species should be arranged.

Before 2001, the bog turtle and the wood turtle were members of the genus Clemmys, but they were moved to a newly created genus, Glyptemys, after further morphological and genetic analyses revealed they were much closer relatives to each other than to the spotted turtle (Clemmys guttata). The bog turtle and the wood turtle have similar genetic makeups that are marginally different from that of the spotted turtle, the only current member of the genus Clemmys. The western pond turtle (Actinemys marmorata) was also a former member of Clemmys, but it was recently moved to the genus Actinemys, of which it is now the only member. Both Glyptemys turtles have karyotypes of 50 chromosomes.

The several common names for the bog turtle include marsh turtle, mud turtle, Muhlenberg's turtle, snapper, and yellowhead; while the wood turtle may be referred to as the red leg, red-legged tortoise, and sculptured tortoise.

== Description ==
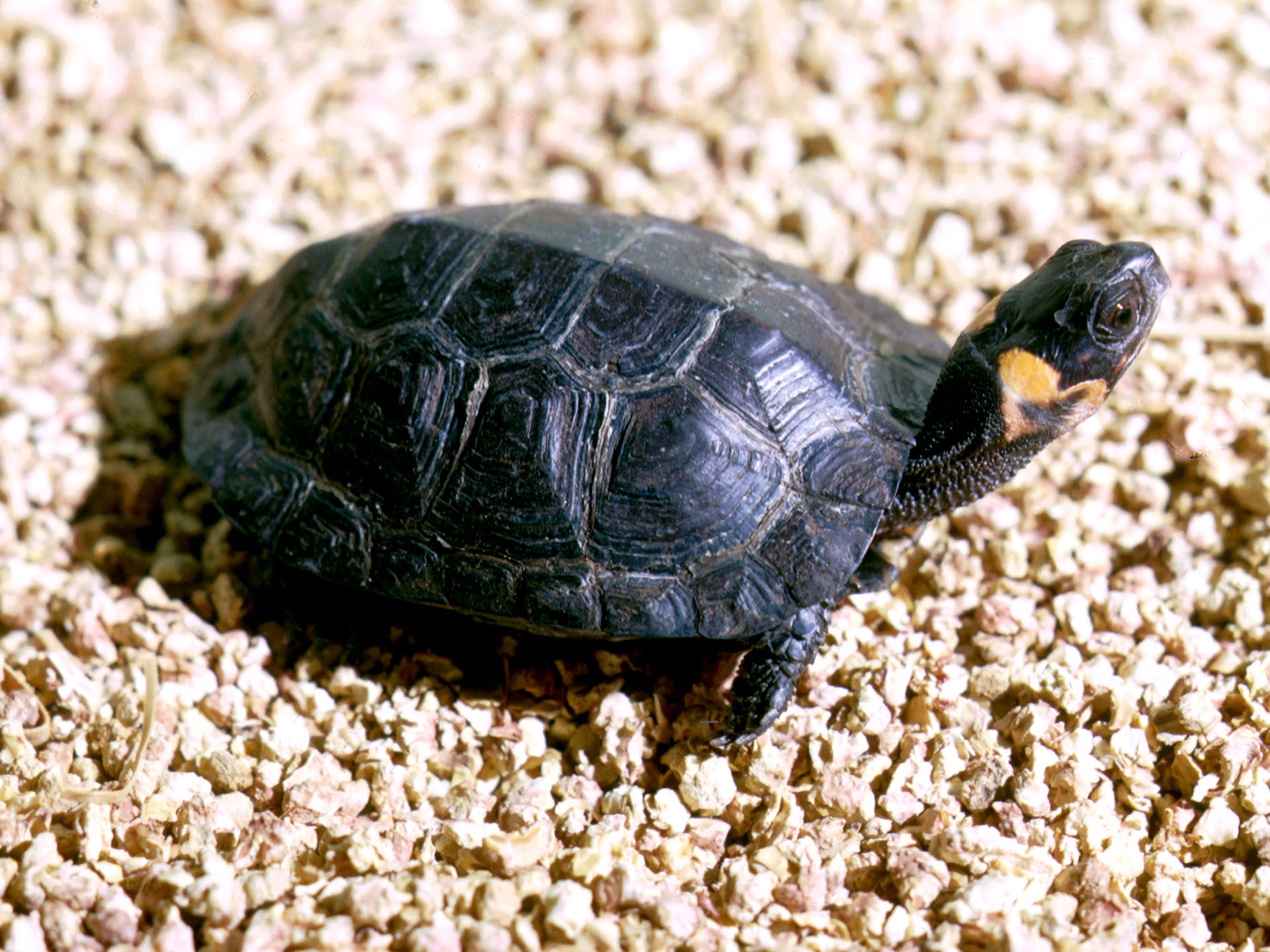
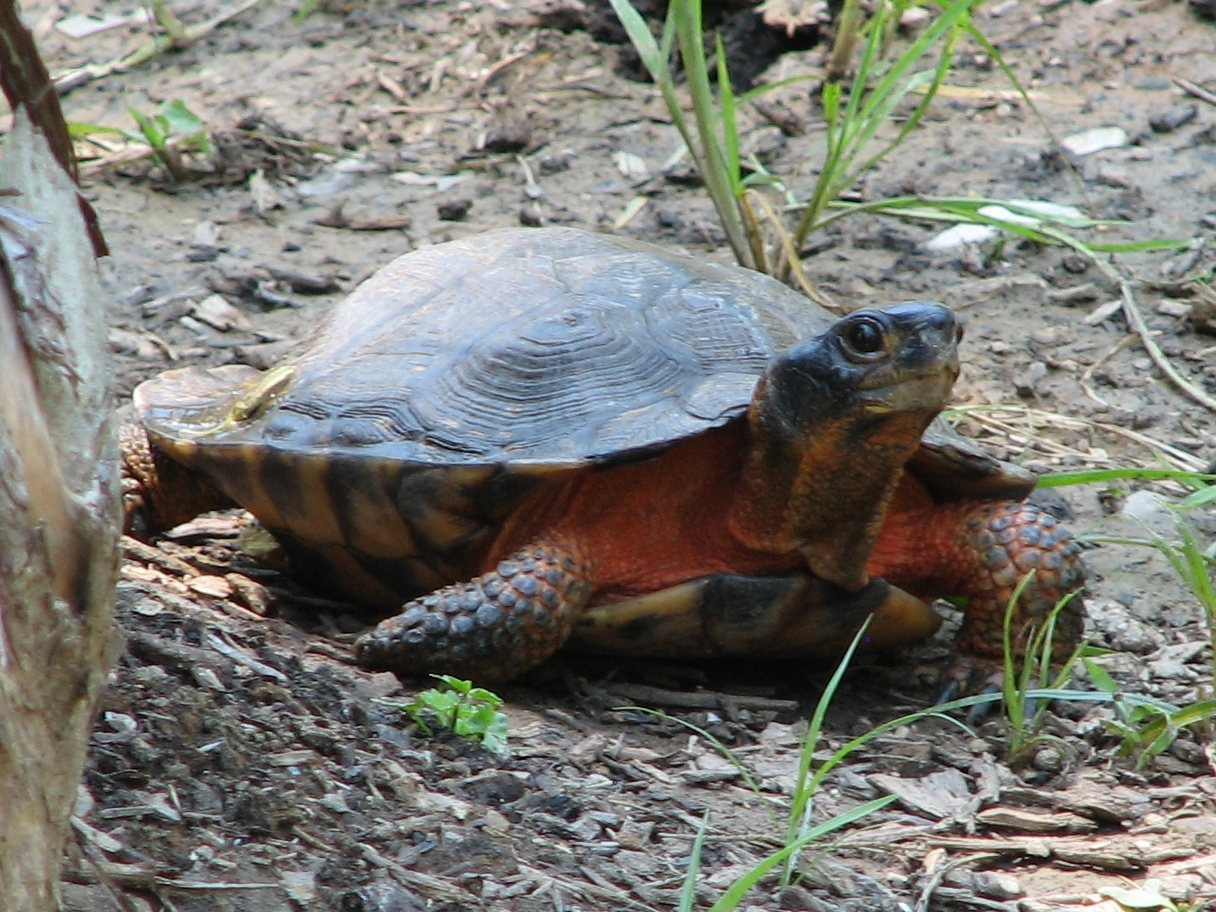
Although the Glyptemys turtles may not be the same size, they share certain morphological and genetic attributes.

Glyptemys turtles are small to medium in size: bog turtle males grow to 9.4 cm (3.7 in) in straight carapace length, and females to 8.9 cm (3.5 in). Wood turtles of either gender reach 14 to 20 cm (5.5 to 7.9 in) in length. Bog turtles weigh 110 g (3.9 oz) and wood turtles average 1 kg (2.2 lb) at maturity. The bog turtle can be recognized by small, bright blotches on each side of its neck, and the wood turtle by its dark gray to black head and bright orange coloration on its ventral surfaces.

The wood turtle exhibits genetic sex determination, in contrast to the temperature-dependent sex determination of most turtles; the method of sex determination for the bog turtle is unknown.

== Distribution and habitat ==
The wood turtle's distribution (left) extends farther north than the bog turtle's (right)

Glyptemys turtles are endemic to eastern North America. Their collective range extends from Nova Scotia south to Georgia and from Nova Scotia west to Minnesota. These turtles are semiaquatic and are commonly found in bogs, fens, and small streams which have soft yet compacted, sandy bottoms.

=== Evolutionary history ===
During the last post-Pleistocene ice age, Glyptemys turtles were forced south by encroaching glaciers from the north. After glaciation, some turtle colonies relocated to their original northern range, while others continued to live in the new, southern range. Some fossil remains from the Rancholabrean period (300,000 to 11,000 years BP) have been found in Georgia and Tennessee, areas farther south than the turtles' current range.

== Ecology and behavior ==
Turtles of the genus Glyptemys are diurnal and become active in the early morning. During extremely cold days, they each may spend time under water, while the bog turtle has been known to also seek dense underbrush or mud in which to bury itself. Excessively hot days sometimes causes these turtles to estivate.

== Conservation ==
Both species of turtles in the genus Glyptemys are protected throughout their geographic ranges. The bog turtle is considered critically endangered by the IUCN, while the wood turtle is labeled as endangered, a less dire rating.

For more information on species conservation, see the individual species pages of the bog turtle and the wood turtle.
