= Ferdinand August Maria Franz von Ritgen =

Ferdinand August Maria Franz von Ritgen (11 October 1787 – 14 April 1867) was a German obstetrician and naturalist born in the Westphalian village of Wulfen (now part of Dorsten). He is remembered for instruction in the field of midwifery.

He studied at Giessen and later worked as district medical officer at Stadtberge. In 1814 he attained the chair of surgery and obstetrics at the University of Giessen. Subsequently, he founded a school for midwives. In 1825/26 and 1837/38 he served as university rector.

Ritgen was editor of the journal Gemeinsame deutsche Zeitschrift für Geburtskunde. His name is associated with the so-called "Ritgen's maneuver" (German: Ritgen-Hinterdammgriff), an obstetrical technique defined as delivery of a child's head by pressure on the perineum while controlling the speed of delivery by pressure with the other hand on the head.

Ritgen was also interested in natural sciences, publishing works in the fields of botany, geology, zoology and even astronomy. In 1826 he proposed the dinosaur species name of Megalosaurus conybeari from fragmentary fossils found in England, however, during the following year, Gideon Mantell gave it the binomial of Megalosaurus bucklandii (its present name). In 1828 Ritgen described the North American turtle genus Clemmys.

He was the father of architect Hugo von Ritgen (1811-1889).

== Written works ==
- In obstetrics:
- Handbuch der niedern Geburtshülfe, 1824 - Manual of the lower midwifery.
- Pathologie und Therapie der Afterbildungen, (1828) - Pathology and therapy following training.
- Lehr- und Handbuch der Geburtshülfe für Hebammen, 1848 - Teaching aid and manual on obstetrics for midwives, 1848.
- In natural sciences:
- Versuch einer natürlichen Eintheilung der Amphibien 1826 - Essay on a natural division of amphibians.
- Versuch einer natürlichen Eintheilung der Vögel 1826 - Essay on a natural division of birds.
