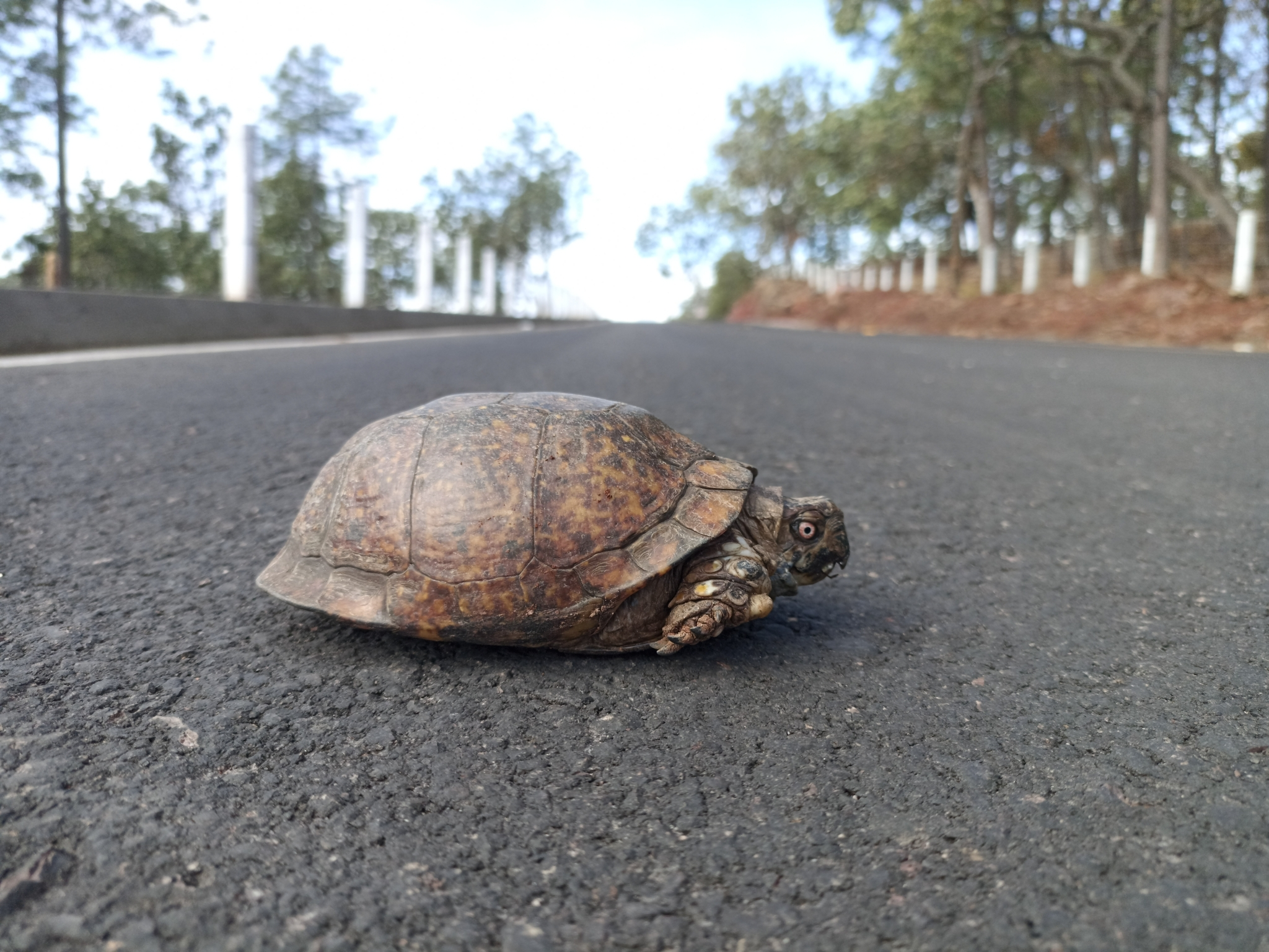
- Terrapene nelsoni nelsoni seen in Nayarit, Mexico

Conservation status
- Data Deficient (IUCN 2.3)
- CITES Appendix II

Scientific classification
- Kingdom: Animalia
- Phylum: Chordata
- Class: Reptilia
- Order: Testudines
- Suborder: Cryptodira
- Family: Emydidae
- Genus: Terrapene
- Species: T. nelsoni

Binomial name
- Terrapene nelsoni Stejneger, 1925

Synonyms
- Terrapene nelsoni nelsoni: Terrapene nelsoni Stejneger, 1925; Terrapene nelsoni nelsoni — Mertens & Wermuth, 1955; Terrepene nelsoni — Pawley, 1971; Terapene nelsoni — Nietzke, 1973; Terrapene nelsoni klauberi: Terrapene klauberi Bogert, 1943; Terrapene nelsoni klauberi — Mertens & Wermuth, 1955; Terapene klauberi — Nietzke, 1973

= Spotted box turtle =

Species of turtle

The spotted box turtle (Terrapene nelsoni) is a species of turtle in the family Emydidae. The species is endemic to the Sierra Madre Occidental in Mexico.

== Etymology ==
The specific name, nelsoni, is in honor of American biologist Edward William Nelson.

== Subspecies ==
Two subspecies are recognized as being valid, including the nominotypical subspecies (listed in alphabetical order by subspecific name).

- Northern spotted box turtle (Terrapene nelsoni klauberi) Bogert, 1943
- Southern spotted box turtle (Terrapene nelsoni nelsoni) Stejneger, 1925

== Sources ==
- Tortoise & Freshwater Turtle Specialist Group (1996). Terrapene nelsoni. 2006 IUCN Red List of Threatened Species. Retrieved 29 July 2007.
