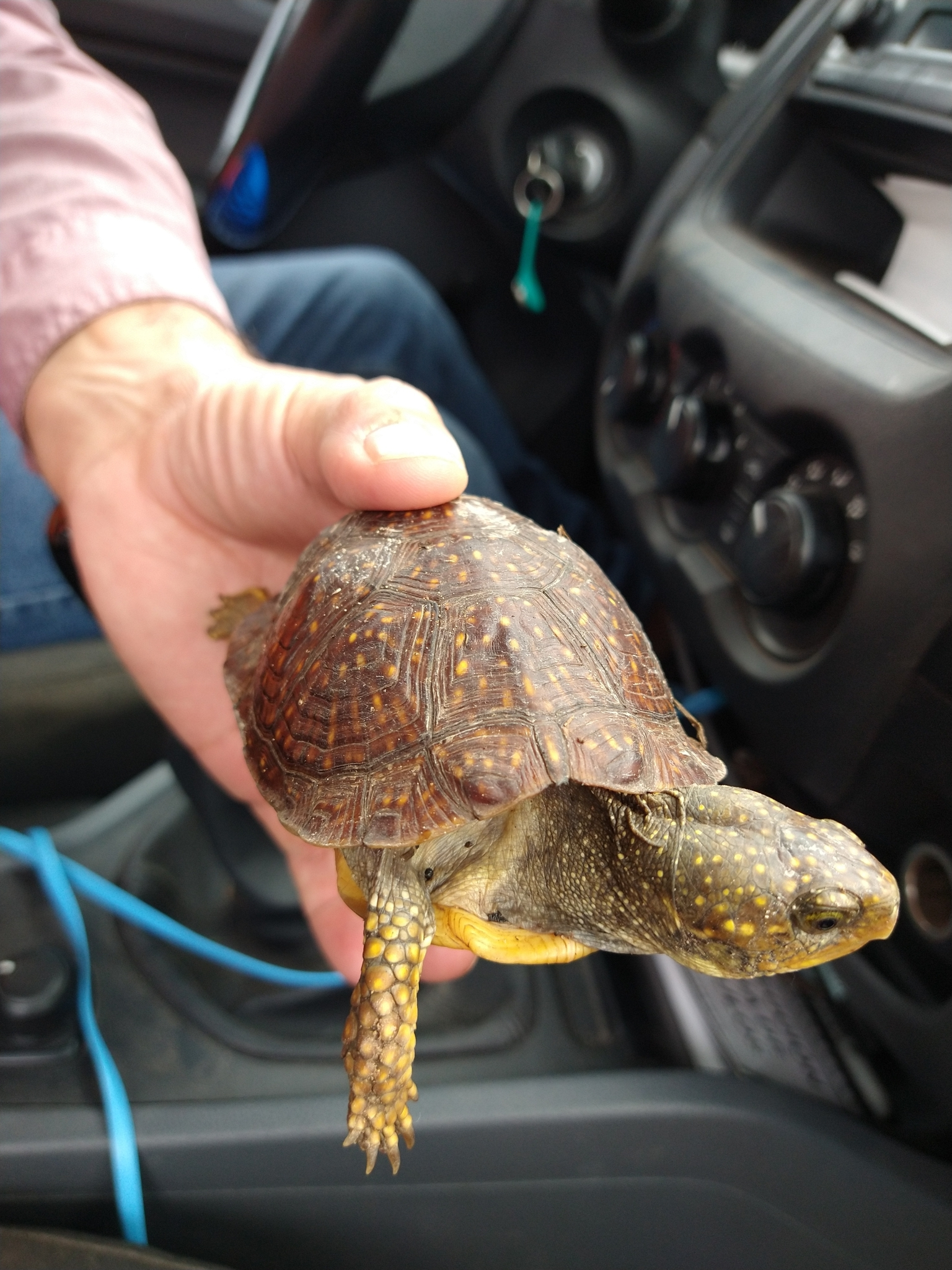
- seen in Sonora, Mexico

Scientific classification
- Kingdom: Animalia
- Phylum: Chordata
- Class: Reptilia
- Order: Testudines
- Suborder: Cryptodira
- Family: Emydidae
- Genus: Terrapene
- Species: T. nelsoni
- Subspecies: T. n. klauberi

Trinomial name
- Terrapene nelsoni klauberi Bogert, 1943

Synonyms
- Terrapene klauberi Bogert, 1943; Terrapene nelsoni klauberi — Mertens & Wermuth, 1955; Terapene klauberi — Nietzke, 1973

= Northern spotted box turtle =

Subspecies of turtle

The northern spotted box turtle (Terrapene nelsoni klauberi), also commonly known as Klauber's box turtle and Klauber's spotted box turtle, is a subspecies of turtle in the family Emydidae.

== Geographic range ==
T. n. klauberi is endemic to the Sierra Madre Occidental in Mexico.

== Etymology ==
The subspecific name, klauberi, is in honor of American herpetologist Laurence Monroe Klauber.
