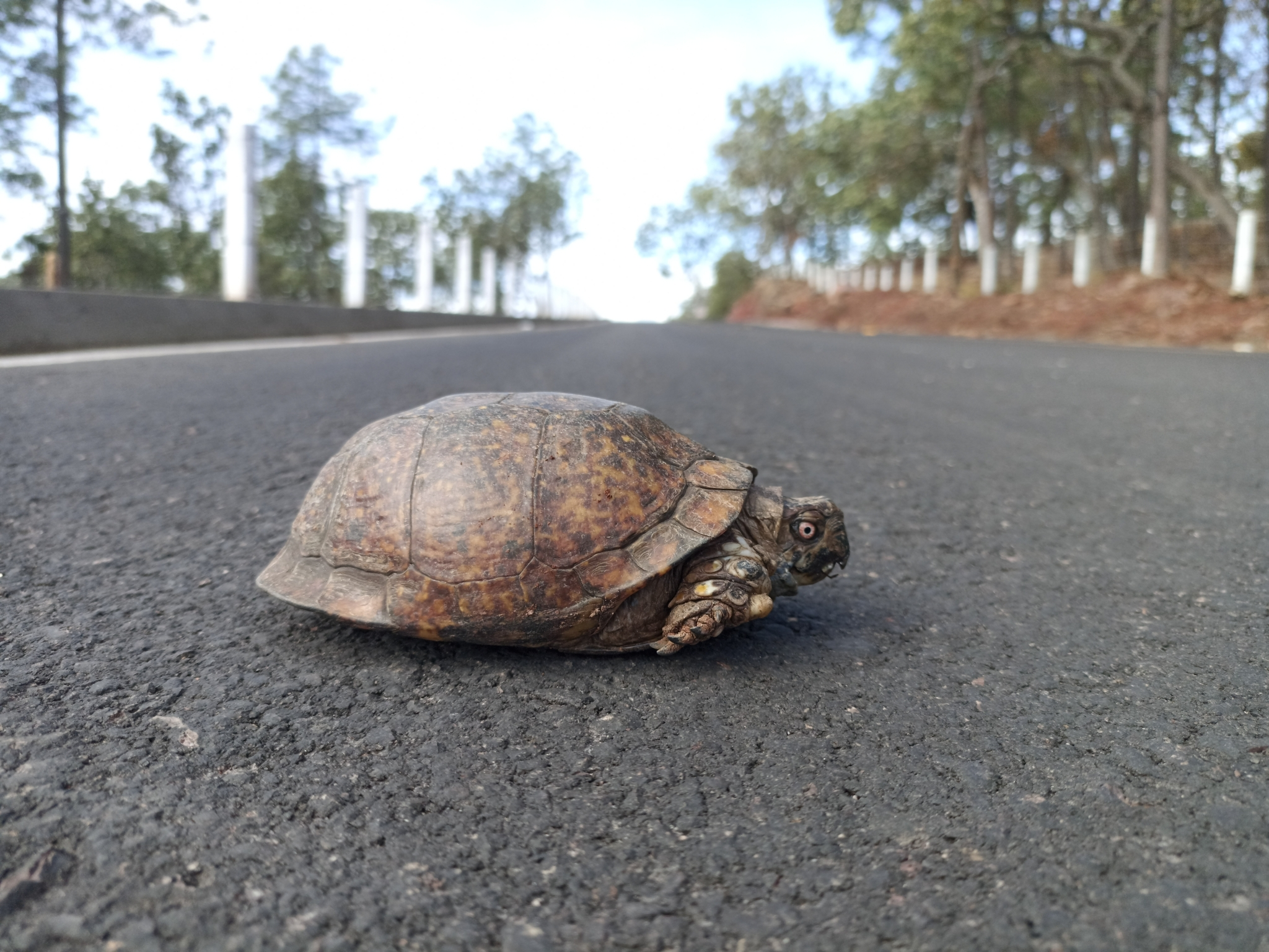
- In Nayarit, Mexico

Conservation status
- Data Deficient (IUCN 2.3)

Scientific classification
- Kingdom: Animalia
- Phylum: Chordata
- Class: Reptilia
- Order: Testudines
- Suborder: Cryptodira
- Family: Emydidae
- Genus: Terrapene
- Species: T. nelsoni
- Subspecies: T. n. nelsoni

Trinomial name
- Terrapene nelsoni nelsoni Stejneger, 1925

Synonyms
- Terrapene nelsoni Stejneger, 1925; Terrapene nelsoni nelsoni — Mertens & Wermuth, 1955; Terrepene nelsoni — Pawley, 1971 (ex errore); Terapene nelsoni — Nietzke, 1973 (ex errore)

= Southern spotted box turtle =

Subspecies of turtle

The southern spotted box turtle (Terrapene nelsoni nelsoni) is a subspecies of turtle in the family Emydidae. The subspecies is endemic to the Sierra Madre Occidental in Mexico.

== Sources ==
- Terrapene nelsoni nelsoni at Catalogue of Life.
