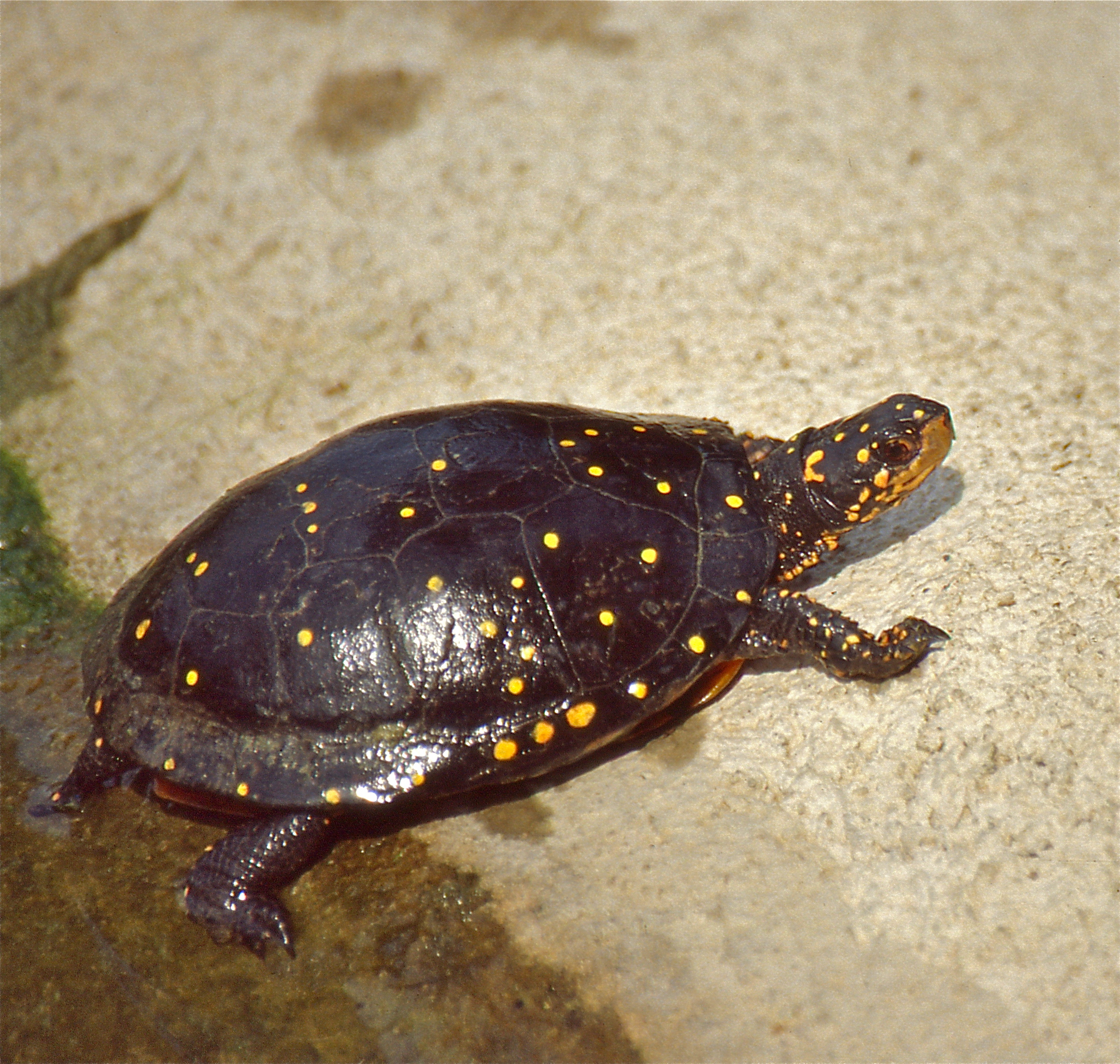
- Spotted turtle (Clemmys guttata)

Scientific classification
- Domain: Eukaryota
- Kingdom: Animalia
- Phylum: Chordata
- Class: Reptilia
- Order: Testudines
- Suborder: Cryptodira
- Superfamily: Testudinoidea
- Family: Emydidae
- Subfamily: Emydinae
- Genus: Clemmys; Ritgen, 1828

Species
- See text

= Clemmys =

Genus of turtle

Clemmys is a genus of turtles currently containing a single extant species, the spotted turtle (Clemmys guttata).

== Taxonomy ==
In the past, several other species were included in the genus, including a number of fossil species. DNA analysis has restricted the genus to containing only the spotted turtle. Fossil species are now restricted to the Neogene of North America as far back as the Miocene.

Extant species formerly in Clemmys

- Wood turtle - now Glyptemys insculpta
- Bog turtle - now Glyptemys muhlenbergii
- Western pond turtle - now Actinemys marmorata

Fossil species

- †Clemmys hesperia Hay, 1903 - Pliocene
- †Clemmys owyheensis Brattstrom & Sturn, 1959 - Miocene (Hemphillian)
