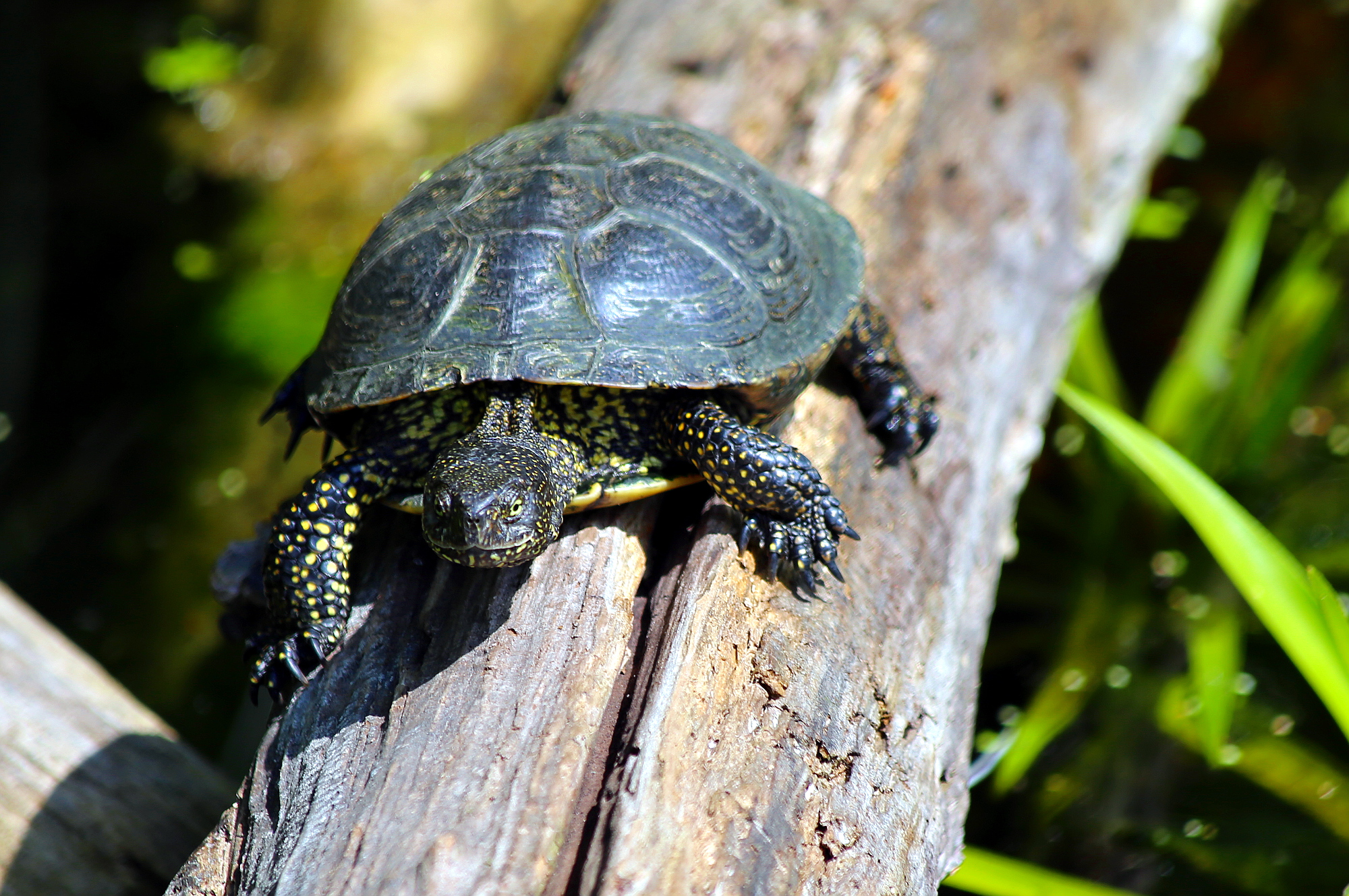
- European pond turtle

Scientific classification
- Kingdom: Animalia
- Phylum: Chordata
- Class: Reptilia
- Order: Testudines
- Suborder: Cryptodira
- Family: Emydidae
- Subfamily: Emydinae
- Genus: Emys; A.M.C. Duméril, 1805
- Key: Range of Emys trinacris. Range of Emys orbicularis. Range of Emydoidea blandingii (formerly Emys blandingii) Range of Actinemys marmorata (formerly Emys marmorata)

= Emys =

Genus of turtles

Emys is a small genus within the family Emydidae. The genus (sensu lato), consisting primarily of freshwater pond turtles, is endemic to Europe. It is the only genus in its subfamily Emydinae outside of North America.

== Species ==
The following two species may be assigned to the genus Emys (sensu lato).

Image	Scientific name	Common name	Distribution
	Emys orbicularis (Linnaeus, 1758)	European pond turtle	Western Palaearctic
	Emys trinacris Fritz et al., 2005	Sicilian pond turtle	Italy (Sicily)

Nota bene: A binomial authority in parentheses indicates that the species was originally described in a genus other than Emys.
