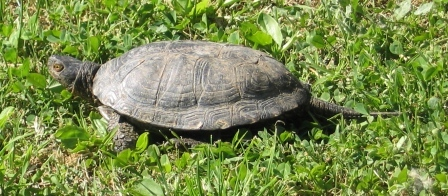
- Emys trinacris from Gorghi Tondi, Province of Trapani, Sicily.

Conservation status
- Data Deficient (IUCN 3.1)

Scientific classification
- Kingdom: Animalia
- Phylum: Chordata
- Class: Reptilia
- Order: Testudines
- Suborder: Cryptodira
- Family: Emydidae
- Genus: Emys
- Species: E. trinacris

Binomial name
- Emys trinacris Fritz, Fattizzo, Guicking, Tripepi, Pennisi, Lenk, Joger & Wink, 2005
- The Sicilian pond turtle is only found in Sicily.

= Sicilian pond turtle =

Species of turtle

The Sicilian pond turtle (Emys trinacris) is a species of turtle in the family Emydidae. The species is endemic to Sicily.

== Etymology ==
The specific name, trinacris, is from the Greek word Trinacria, meaning "three-pointed", the earliest known name for the island of Sicily.

== Description ==
E. trinacris is a small turtle. Its maximum straight carapace length is 14.5 cm (5.7 in). The features of the turtle can vary depending on its location. This is because of a disruption in the gene flow caused by human activities like industrialization. Since there are obstacles in the way like roads and buildings, migrating to different groups is more difficult for the turtles. E. trinacris differs from E. orbicularis by its distinct mitochondrial DNA.

== Habitat ==
The preferred habitat of E. trinacris is freshwater in ponds, lakes, rivers, and swamps.
