= Rockalina =

Eastern box turtle

Rockalina is an eastern box turtle removed from the wild in 1977 and kept on the floor of a residential kitchen until she was rescued in 2025.

Rockalina was captured in 1977, likely as a young adult of 10 to 20 years, by a New York boy who brought her home and kept her on the family's kitchen floor, where she was fed primarily cat food and occasionally fruit or lettuce.

Rockalina was rescued in February 2025 by Garden State Tortoise, a reptile rehabilitation center in New Jersey. When rescued, she was in poor health and dehydrated, with misshapen nails and beak, a missing tail, and was blinded by dead skin covering her eyes. A rear leg had become wrapped in cat hair, cutting off circulation to the limb. Her rehabilitation began with being placed in a bath of warm water, then into an indoor enclosure designed to mimic her natural habitat, and finally to an outdoor enclosure. During the rehabilitation period her injuries were treated.

In December 2025 a hatchling eastern box turtle named Pebble was introduced to her enclosure so that she could form a social relationship. By July 2026 the organization reported the introduction was considered successful. Garden State Tortoise was planning to add more box turtles to the enclosure to create a colony mimicking those of a box turtle's typical natural surroundings.
