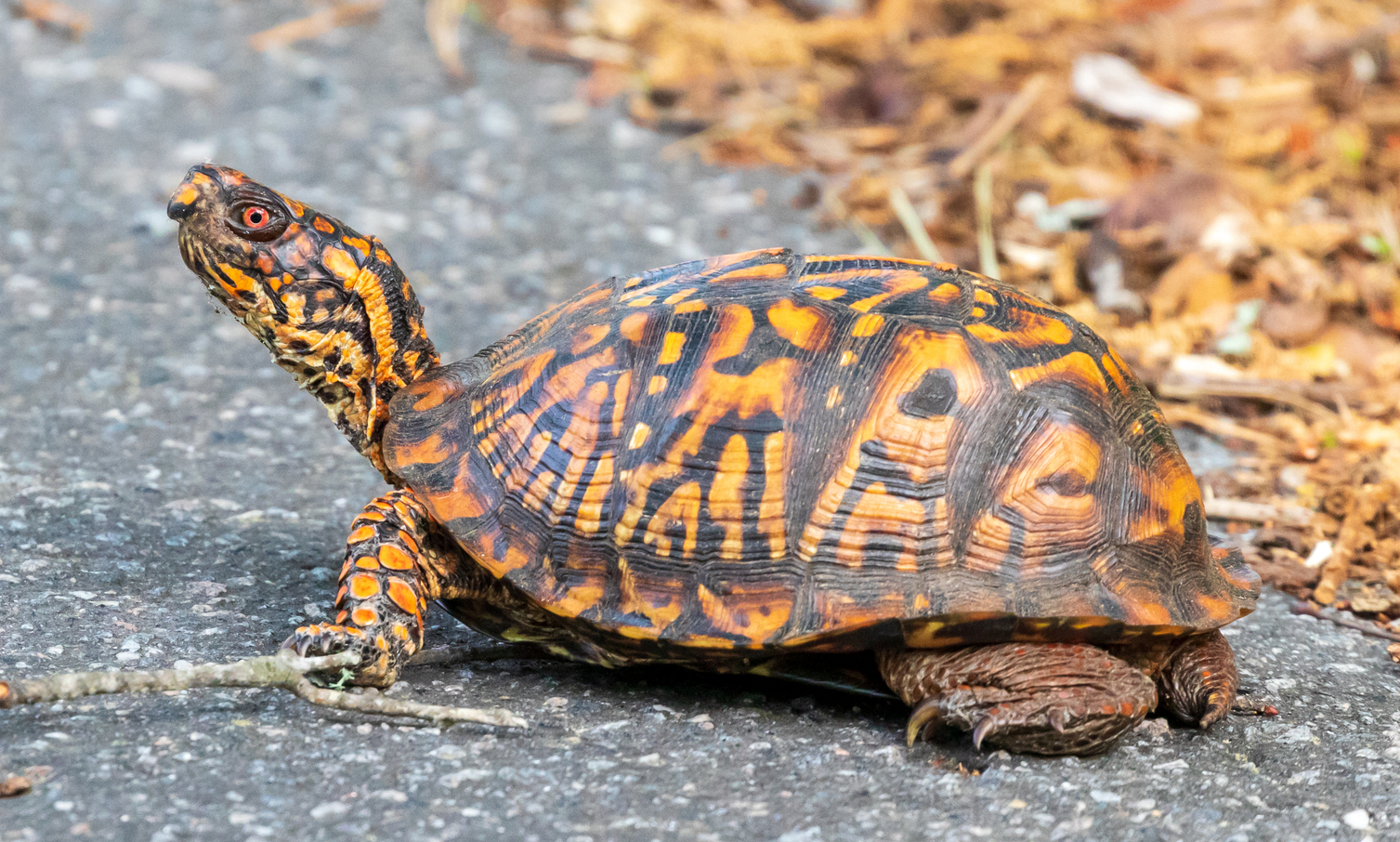
- In North Carolina

Conservation status
- Vulnerable (IUCN 3.1)
- CITES Appendix II

Scientific classification
- Kingdom: Animalia
- Phylum: Chordata
- Class: Reptilia
- Order: Testudines
- Suborder: Cryptodira
- Family: Emydidae
- Genus: Terrapene
- Species: T. carolina
- Subspecies: T. c. carolina

Trinomial name
- Terrapene carolina carolina (Linnaeus, 1758)

Synonyms
- click to expand: Testudo carolina Linnaeus, 1758; Testudo carinata Linnaeus, 1758; Testudo brevicaudata Lacépède, 1788; Testudo incarcerata Bonnaterre, 1789; Testudo incarceratostriata Bonnaterre, 1789; Testudo clausa Gmelin, 1789; Testudo virgulata Latreille, 1801; Testudo caroliniana Daudin, 1801 (ex errore); Emydes clausa Brongniart, 1805; Emys clausa – Schweigger, 1812; Emys schneideri Schweigger, 1812; Emys virgulata – Schweigger, 1812; Didicla clausa – Rafinesque, 1815; Terrapene clausa – Merrem, 1820; Monoclida kentukensis Rafinesque, 1822; Cistudo clausa Say, 1825; Terrapene carolina Bell, 1825; Terrapene maculata Bell, 1825; Terrapene nebulosa Bell, 1825; Terraphene clausa – Gray, 1825; Terrapene virgulata – Fitzinger, 1826; Emys tritentaculata Geoffroy Saint-Hilaire, 1829 (nomen nudum); Emys (Cistuda) carolinae Gray, 1831 (ex errore); Emys kinosternoides Gray, 1831; Testudo irregulata Daudin, 1831 (nomen nudum); Cistuda carolina – Gray, 1831; Didicla clausa – Rafinesque, 1832; Emys cinosternoides A.M.C. Duméril & Bibron, 1835 (ex errore); Emys schneiderii A.M.C. Duméril & Bibron, 1835 (ex errore); Testudo incarceratastriata A.M.C. Duméril & Bibron, 1835 (ex errore); Cinosternon clausum – Henle, 1839; Pyxidemys clausa – Fitzinger, 1843; Terrapene carolina maculata – LeConte, 1854; Terrapene carolina nebulosa – LeConte, 1854; Cistudo carolinensis Gray, 1856 (ex errore); Cistudo carolina – Agassiz, 1857; Cistudo virginea Agassiz, 1857; Terrapene carinata – Strauch, 1862; Cistudo eurypygia Cope, 1869; Cistudo carinata – Garman, 1884; Cistudo carolina var. cinosternoides – Boulenger, 1889; Cinosternum clausum – Hoffmann, 1890; Cistudo cinosternoides – Garman, 1892; Terrapene eurypygia – O.P. Hay, 1902; Terrapene cinosternoides – Siebenrock, 1909; Terrapene carolina carolina – Stejneger & Barbour, 1917; Terrapene cardlina Proctor, 1922 (ex errore); Terepene carolina – Breder, 1924; Terrapene kinosternoides – Lindholm, 1929; Terrapene caritana Schmidt, 1953 (ex errore); Terrapene carolinensis – Schmidt, 1953; Terrapene carolinina Schmidt, 1953 (ex errore)

= Eastern box turtle =

Subspecies of reptile

The eastern box turtle (Terrapene carolina carolina) is a subspecies within a group of hinge-shelled turtles normally called box turtles. T. c. carolina is native to the Eastern United States.

The eastern box turtle is a subspecies of the common box turtle (Terrapene carolina). While in the pond turtle family, Emydidae, and not a tortoise, the box turtle is largely terrestrial. Box turtles are slow crawlers, extremely long-lived, and slow to mature and have relatively few offspring per year. These characteristics, along with a propensity to get hit by cars and agricultural machinery, make all box turtle species particularly susceptible to anthropogenic, or human-induced, mortality.

In 2011, citing "a widespread persistent and ongoing gradual decline of Terrapene carolina that probably exceeds 32% over three generations", the International Union for Conservation of Nature (IUCN) downgraded its conservation status from near threatened to vulnerable.

== Distribution and habitat ==
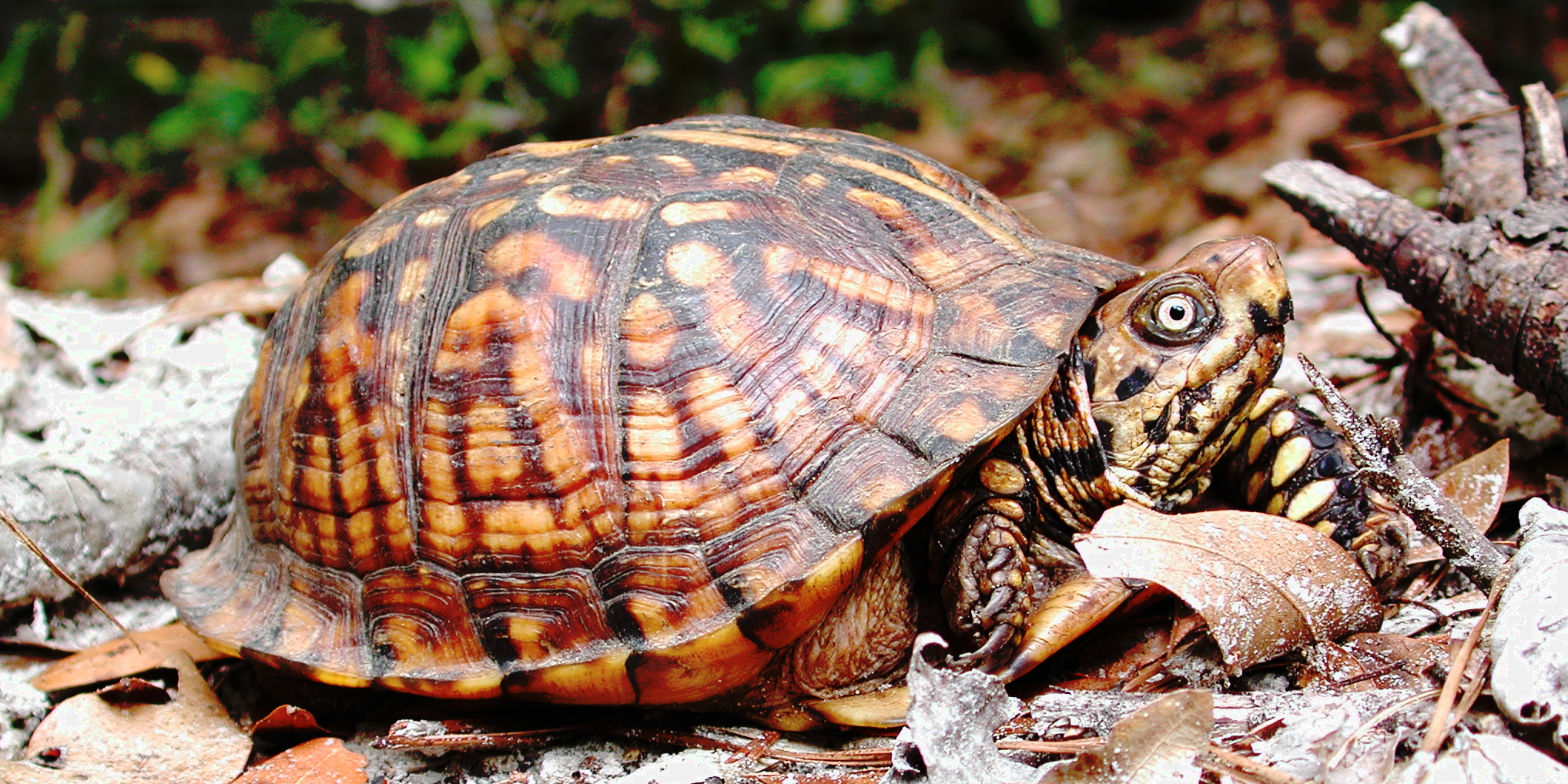
Eastern box turtle in Florida

Eastern box turtles are found exclusively in North America, mainly in the eastern United States, as its name implies. They occur as far north as southern Maine and the southern and eastern portions of the Michigan Upper Peninsula, south to northern Florida and west to eastern Kansas, Oklahoma, and Texas. In the northern parts of their range, they are rarely found above 1,000 feet (305 m) in elevation, while they may be found up to 6,000 feet (1,830 m) in the southern parts of their range. The eastern box turtle is considered uncommon to rare in the Great Lakes region; however, populations can be found in areas not bisected by heavily traveled roads. In the Midwest, it is a species of concern (or special concern, depending on the terminology used by the state) in Ohio, Michigan, and Indiana.

Eastern box turtles prefer an enriched habitat over a barren one. They prefer deciduous or mixed forested regions, with a moderately moist forest floor that has good drainage. A population density of 7.6-9.2 adult turtles per acre was estimated in a mature hardwood forest in eastern Tennessee. Bottomland forest is preferred over hillsides and ridges. They can also be found in open grasslands, pastures, or under fallen logs or in moist ground, usually moist leaves or wet dirt.

== Description ==
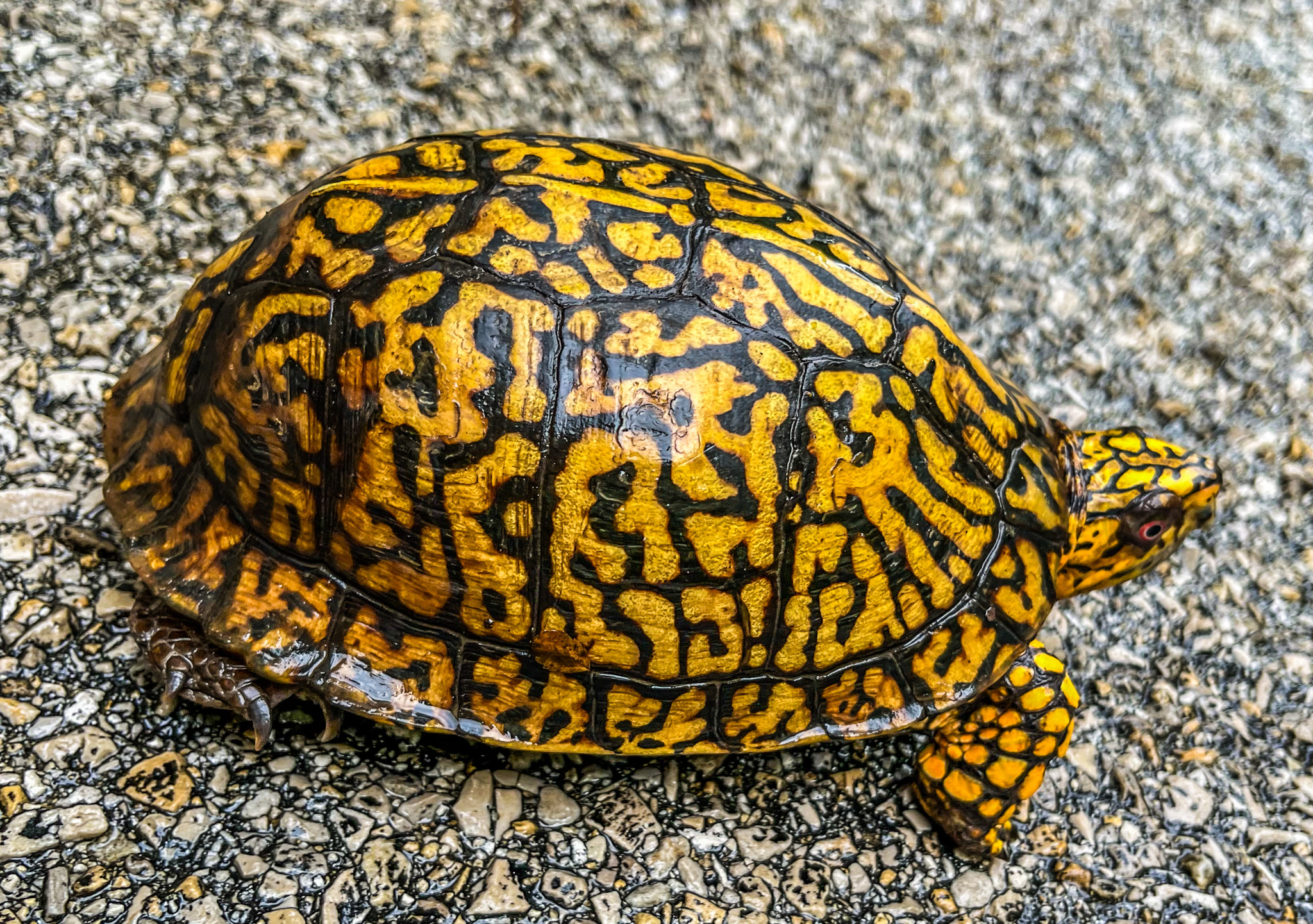
In Indiana

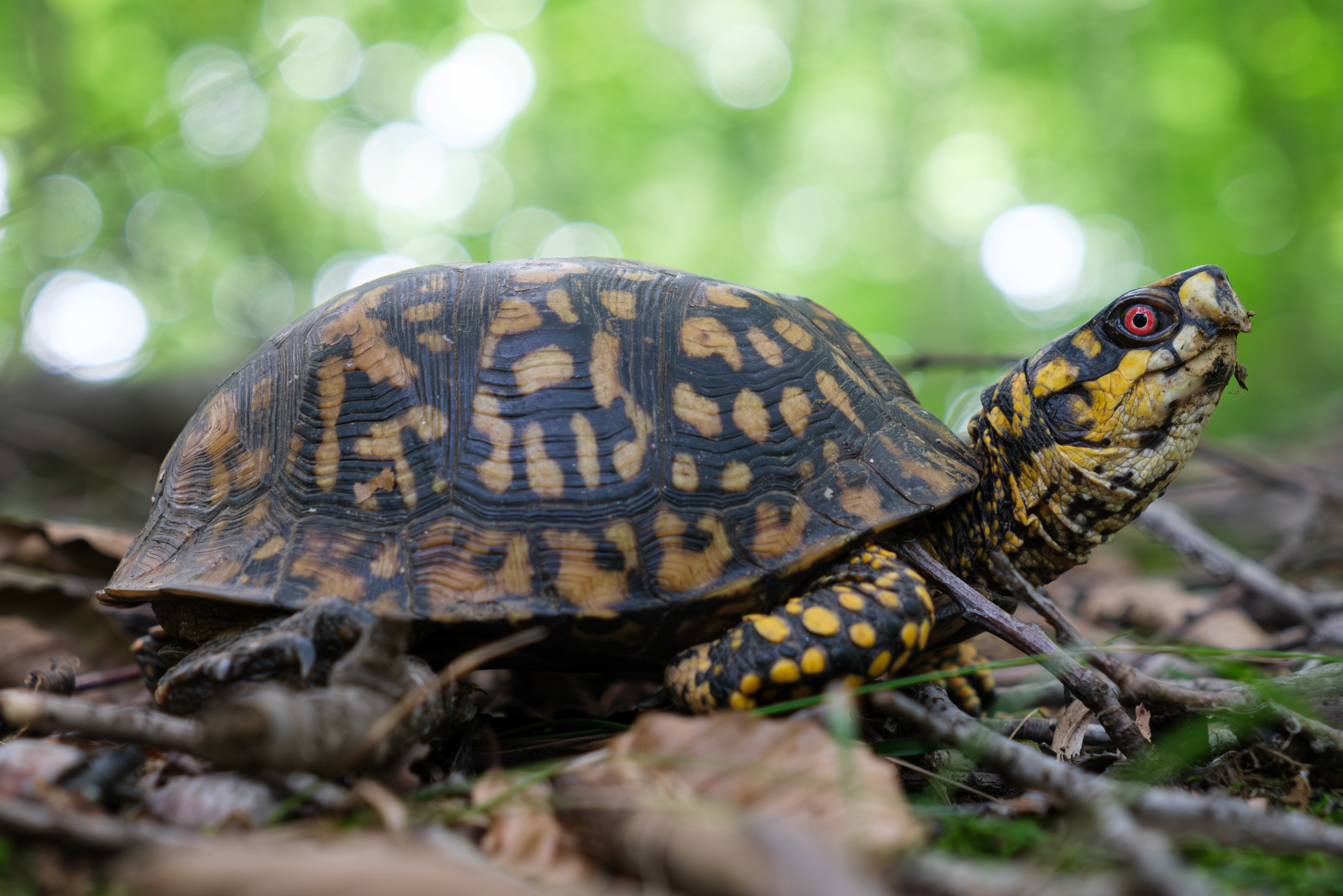
In Maryland

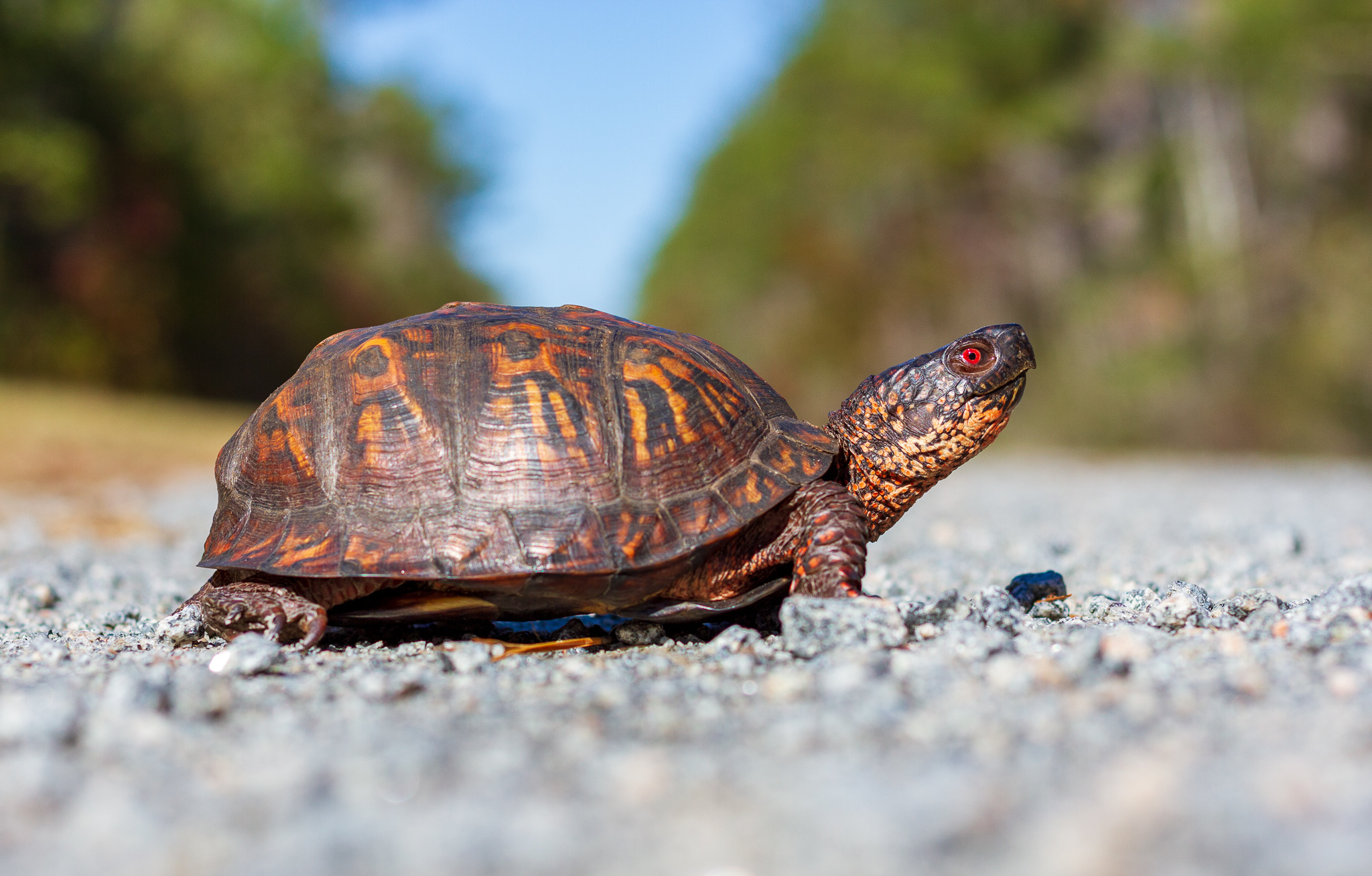
In North Carolina

Eastern box turtles have a high, domelike carapace and a hinged plastron that allows total shell closure. Their shell has a middorsal keel that smooths out with age. The carapace can be of variable coloration but is normally brownish or black and accompanied by a yellowish or orangish radiating pattern of lines, spots, or blotches. Skin coloration, like that of the shell, is variable but is usually brown or black with some yellow, orange, red, or white spots or streaks. This coloration closely mimics that of the winter leaf of the tulip poplar. In some isolated populations, males may have blue patches on their cheeks, throat, and front legs. Furthermore, males normally possess red eyes (irises), whereas females usually have brown eyes. Eastern box turtles feature a sharp, horned beak and stout limbs, and their feet are webbed only at the base. Eastern box turtles have five toes on each front leg and normally four toes on each hind leg, although some individuals may possess three toes on each hind leg. Eastern box turtles range in size from 4.5 to 8 in (11 to 20 cm) long.

Eastern box turtles have many uniquely identifying characteristics as part of the box turtle group. While the female's plastron is flat, it is concave in males so the male may fit over the back end of the female's carapace during mating. The front and back of the plastron are connected by a flexible hinge. When in danger, the turtle is able to close the plastron by pulling the hinged sections closely against the carapace, effectively sealing the soft body in bone, hence forming a "box". The shell is made of bone covered by living vascularized tissue and covered with a layer of keratin. This shell is connected to the body through its fused rib cage which makes the shell permanently attached and not removable.

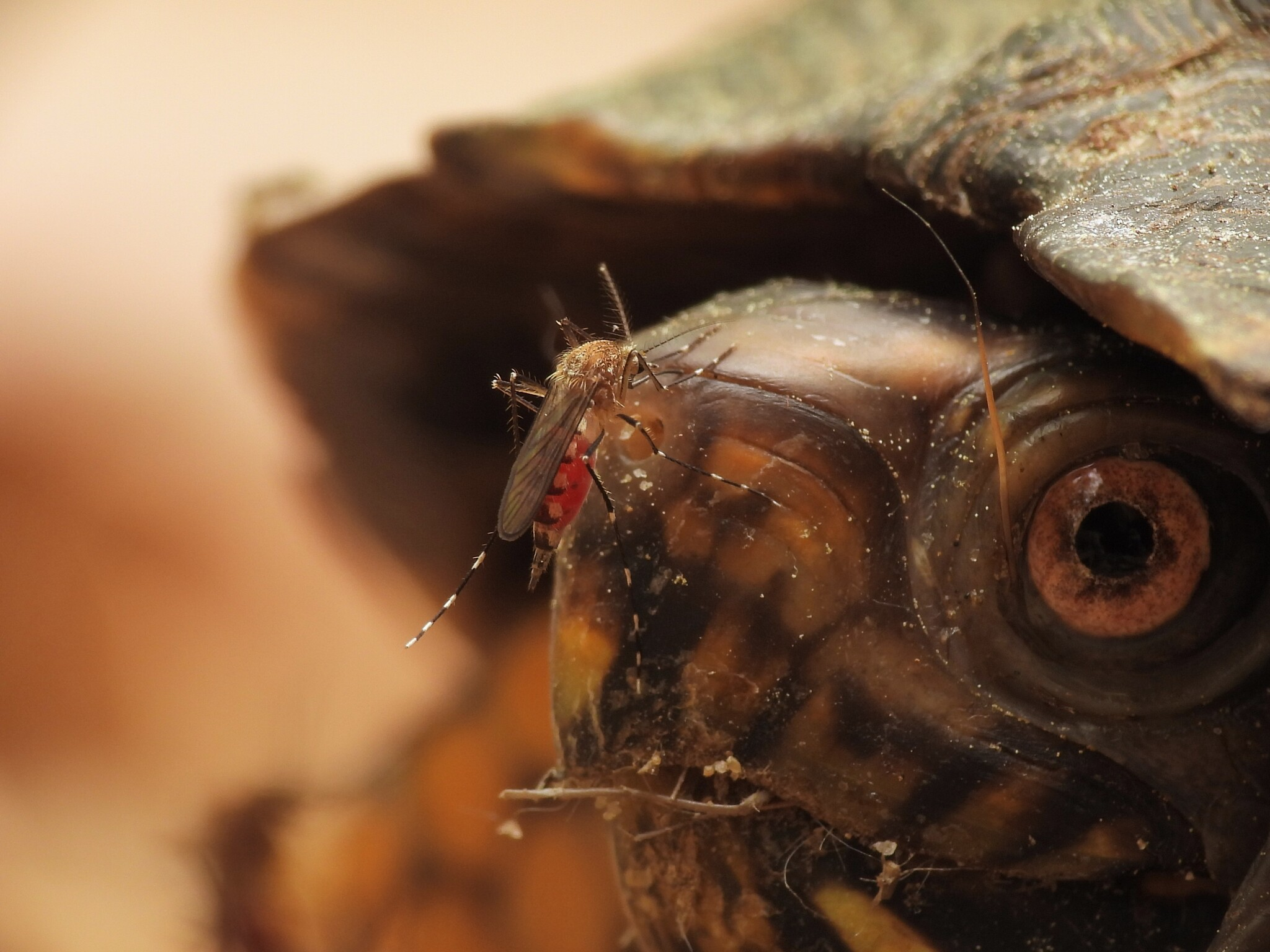
Aedes canadensis taking a blood meal from an eastern box turtle, in New Jersey

When injured or damaged, the shell has the capacity to regenerate and reform. Granular tissue slowly forms and keratin slowly grows underneath the damaged area to replace damaged and missing scutes. Over time, the damaged area falls off, revealing the new keratin formed beneath it. Unlike water turtles such as the native eastern painted turtle (Chrysemys picta), box turtle scutes continue to grow throughout the turtle's life and develop growth rings. Water turtles typically shed their scutes as they grow.

Females' rear claws are longer and straighter. Males have longer and thicker tails.

== Behaviour ==
As ectotherms, Eastern box turtles must maintain temperature homeostasis by seeking cover, such as shaded forests or streams, when body temperatures are high and by finding basking locations when body temperatures are low, in order to increase their metabolic rate for foraging and digestion

Terrapene carolina is more active in the morning than at other times and is known to burrow in leafy debris, brush, or soil. These burrows are called "resting forms" and they are used to regulate temperature or hydrate. They have also been known to take "baths" in shallow streams and ponds or puddles, and during hot periods may submerge in mud for days at a time. However, if placed in water that is too deep (completely submerged), they may drown. Many Eastern box turtles try to avoid stressful environmental conditions. During winter, these turtles will burrow into the soil and stay dormant until the temperature rises.

Eastern box turtles are known to have high site fidelity and remain in the same home range for a very long period. Some have been known to stay at the same site for upwards of 32 years, which is highly uncommon for reptiles. Their low dispersal makes them vulnerable to the effects of climate change.They have a very strong homing instinct and will rarely travel more than 1.5 miles (2.5 km) from their home territory. When they are relocated, they will still try to find their way back to their original home range. Home ranges of relocated turtles can be up to be three times larger than resident turtles in an area. They move less when in an isolated habitat.

== Diet ==
The eating habits of eastern box turtles vary greatly due to individual taste, temperature, lighting, and their surrounding environment. Unlike warm-blooded animals, their metabolism does not drive their appetite; instead, they can just lessen their activity level, retreat into their shells, and halt their food intake until better conditions arise.

In the wild, eastern box turtles are opportunistic omnivores and will feed on a variety of animal and vegetable matter. There are a variety of foods which are universally accepted by eastern box turtles, which include earthworms, snails, slugs, grubs, beetles, caterpillars, grasses, weeds, fallen fruit, berries, mushrooms, flowers, duck weed, and carrion. Studies at Jug Bay Wetlands Sanctuary in Maryland have also shown that eastern box turtles have fed on live birds that were trapped in netting. Many times, they will eat an item of food, especially in captivity, just because it looks and smells edible, such as hamburger or eggs, even though the food may be harmful or unhealthy. Diet varies very little between seasons, with box turtles consuming plant matter and invertebrates during every feeding season, and mushrooms and snails during certain months. Young are primarily carnivorous and adults are mostly herbivorous.

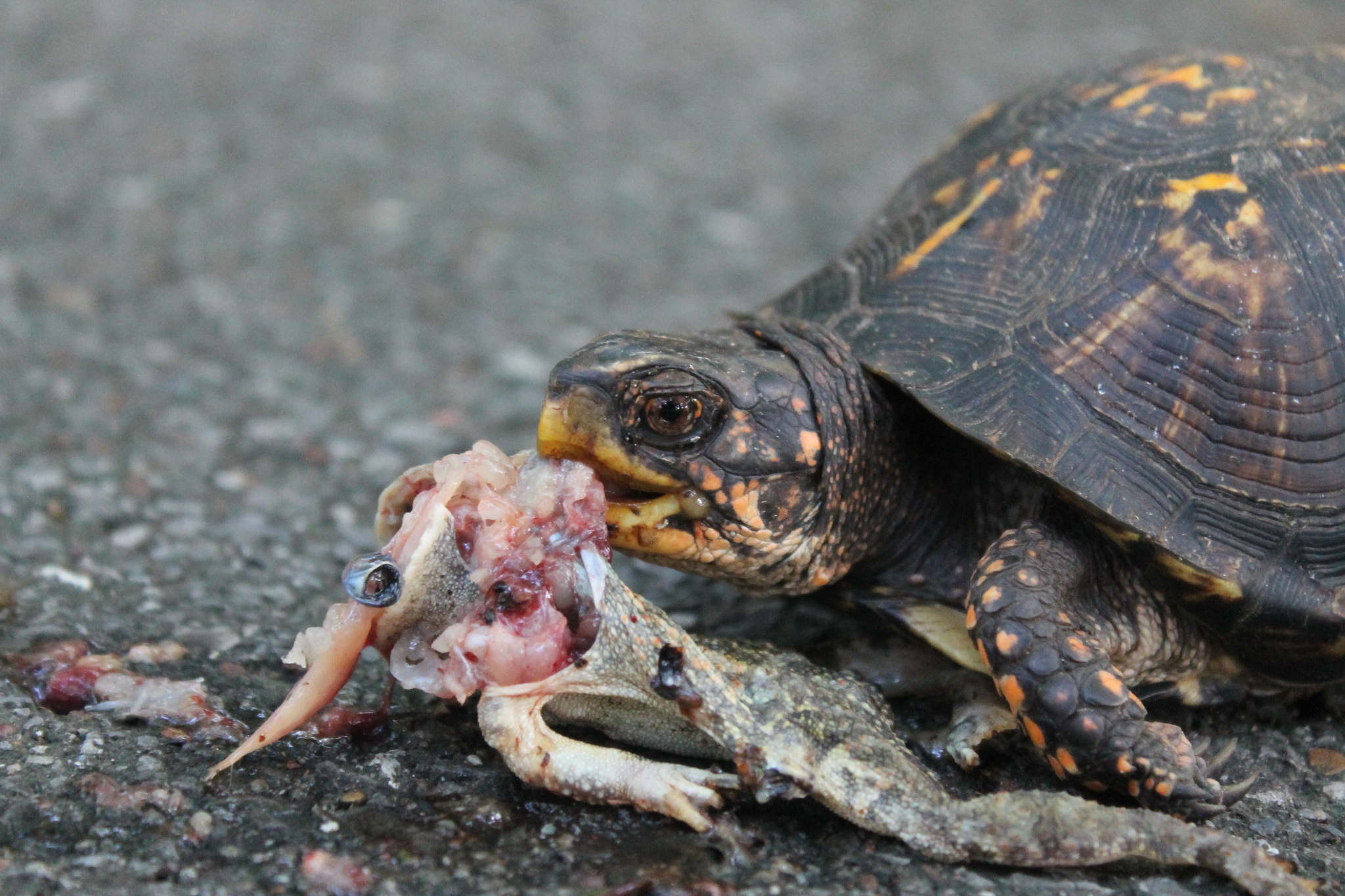
Feeding on a roadkilled toad

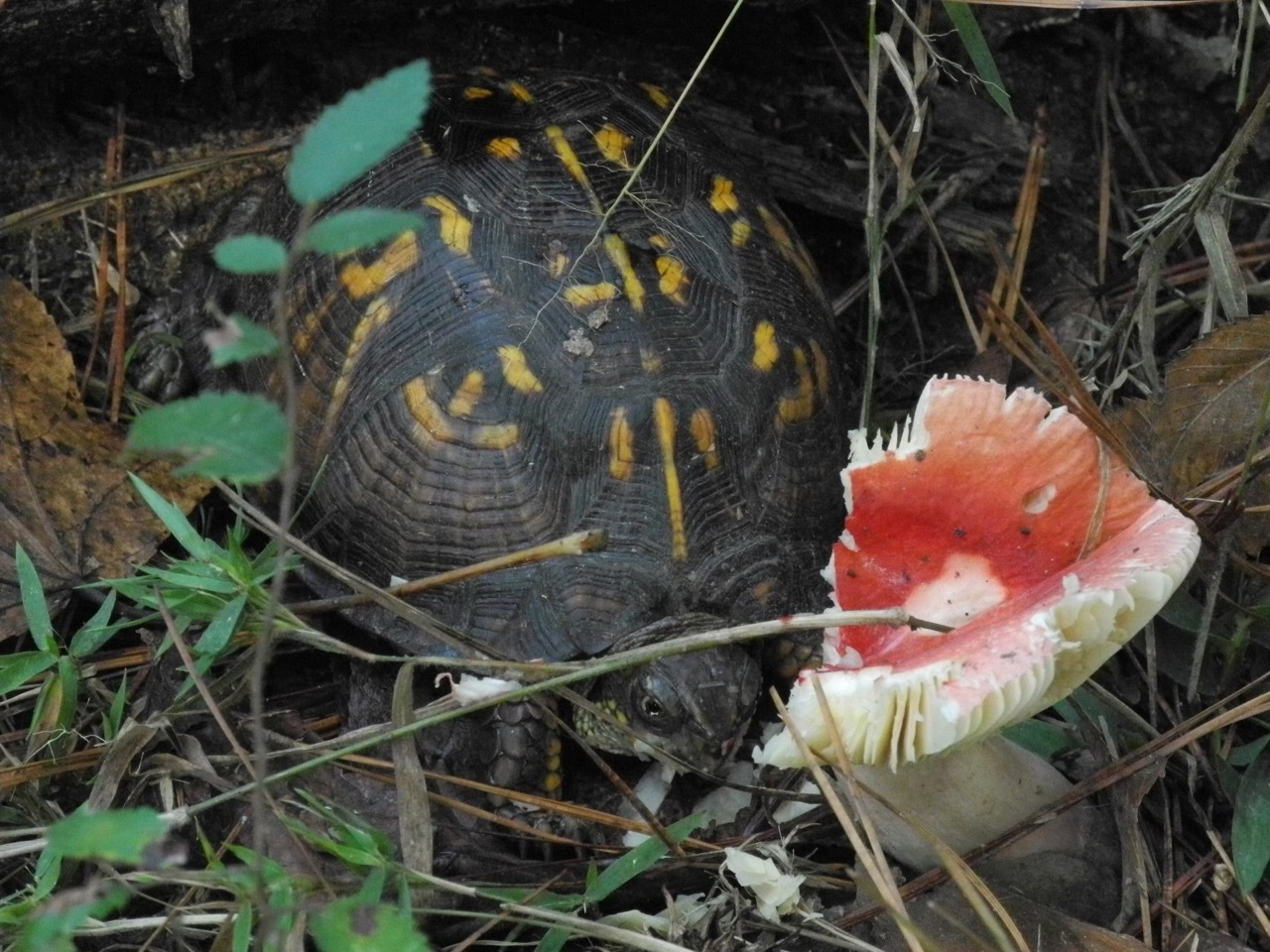
Eating a Russula mushroom

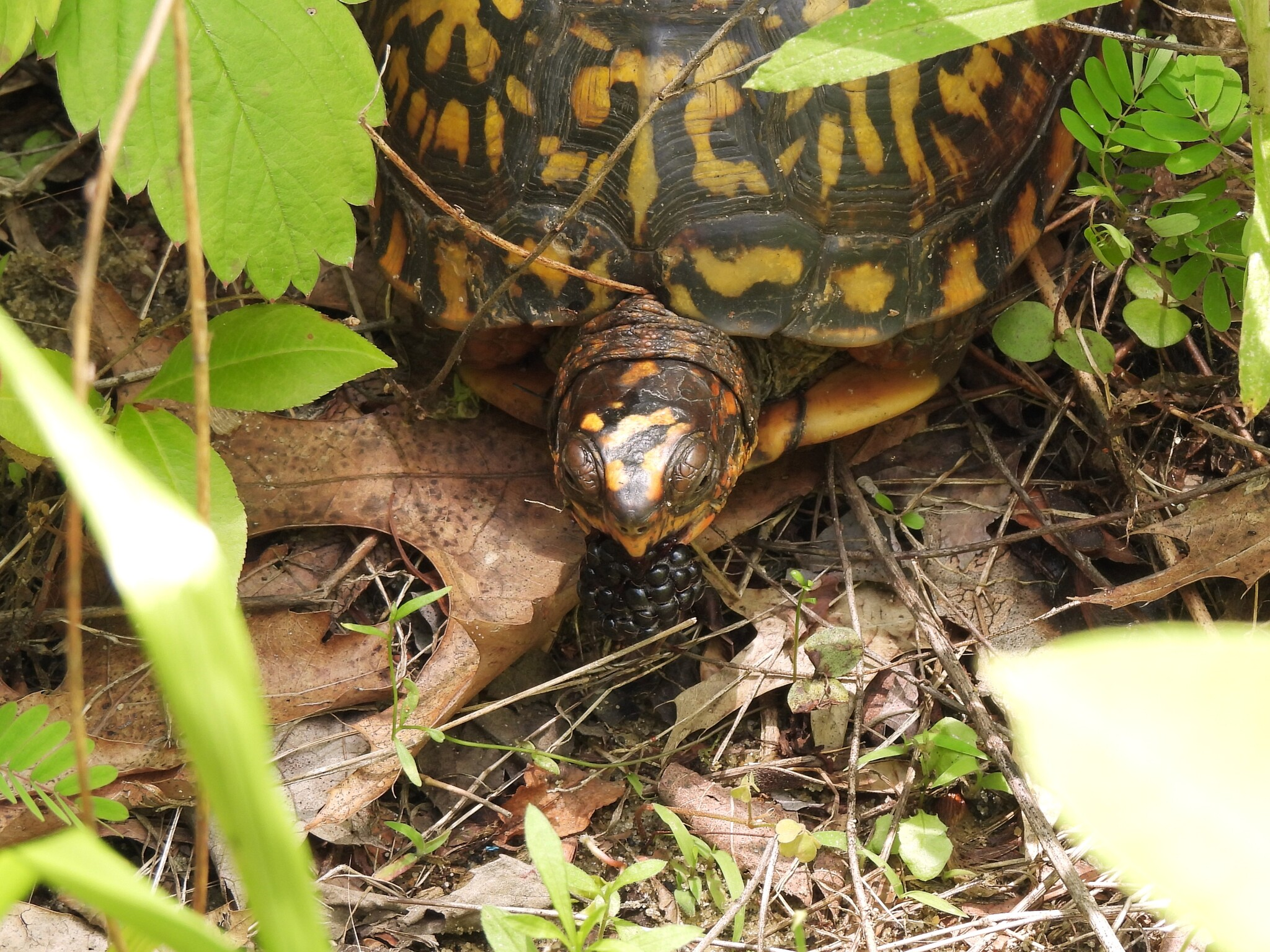
Eating a blackberry

== Reproduction ==
Reproduction for the eastern box turtle can occur at any point throughout the late spring, summer, and early fall months, but egg laying is most likely to occur in May and June, when rain is frequent. After finding a mate (there is no pair bonding, and mate-finding mechanisms are unclear), which can be a difficult task in areas where mates are sparse, the couple will embark on a three-phase courtship event. Following fertilization, the female finds an appropriate nesting site. Nest site selection is vital to egg development, as predation and temperature are primary concerns. Temperature affects the sex of offspring (Type I temperature-dependent sex determination), developmental rate, and possibly fitness. Females will use their hind feet to dig a shallow nest in loose soil; this process can take two to six hours. Eggs are generally deposited shortly after the digging phase, and each egg is deployed into a particular position. Eggs are oblong, 3 cm (1.2 in) long, creamy white, and leathery. Nests are then concealed with grass, leaves, or soil. A female can lay anywhere from 1 to 5 clutches of about 1 to 9 eggs in a single year, or even delay laying her clutch if resources are scarce. After laying a clutch, box turtle hatchlings have been observed hatching in the fall, as well as overwintering and hatching in early spring. There is a theory that clutch size increases with latitude, but more studies are needed to confirm this. Females exhibit delayed fertility, wherein sperm can be stored in oviducts for several years until conditions are favorable for fertilization and laying. Incubation ranges widely depending on temperature, but averages 50 to 70 days.

They have very low reproductive success. Females can lay fertile eggs up to four years after a successful mating.

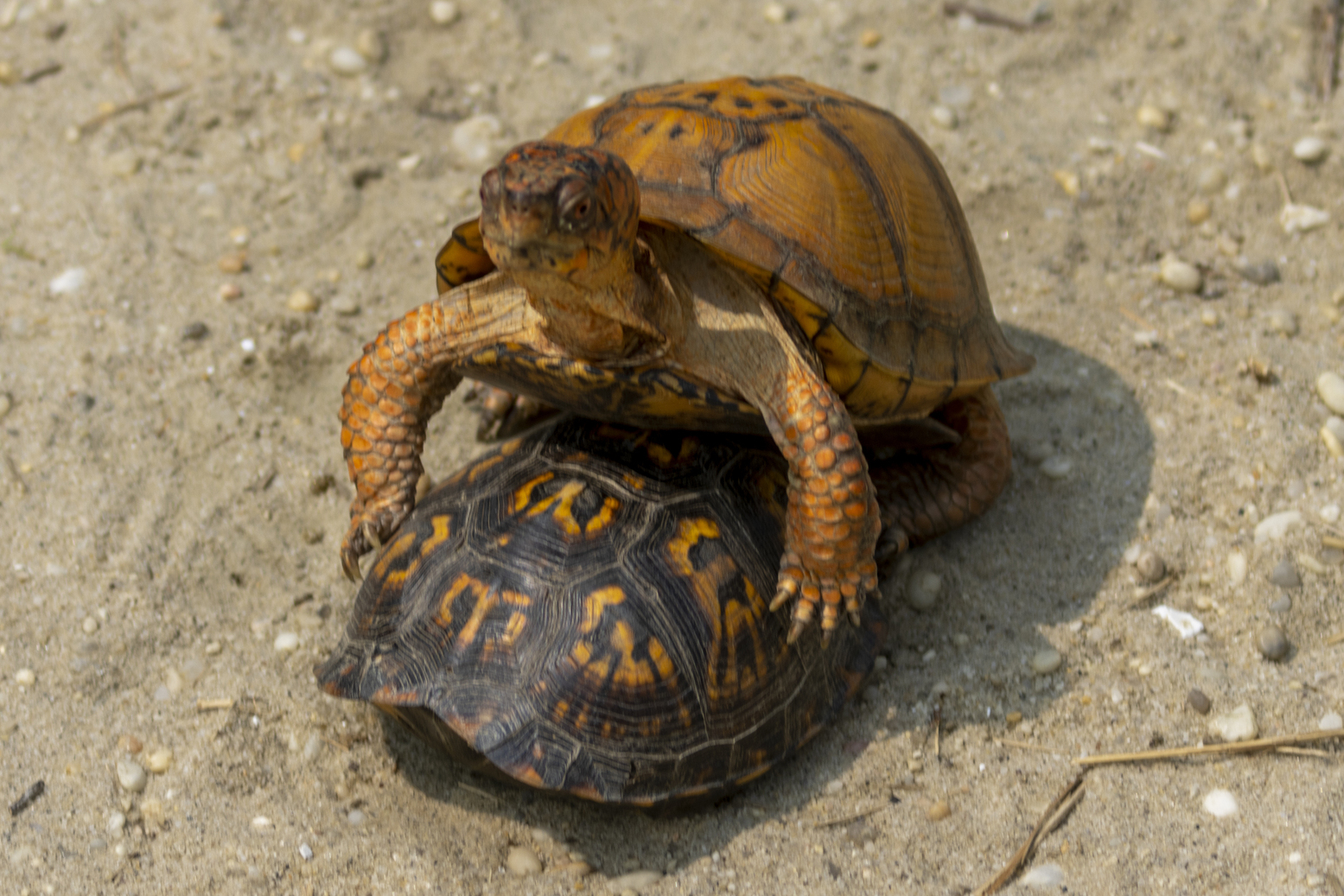
Mating, in New Jersey

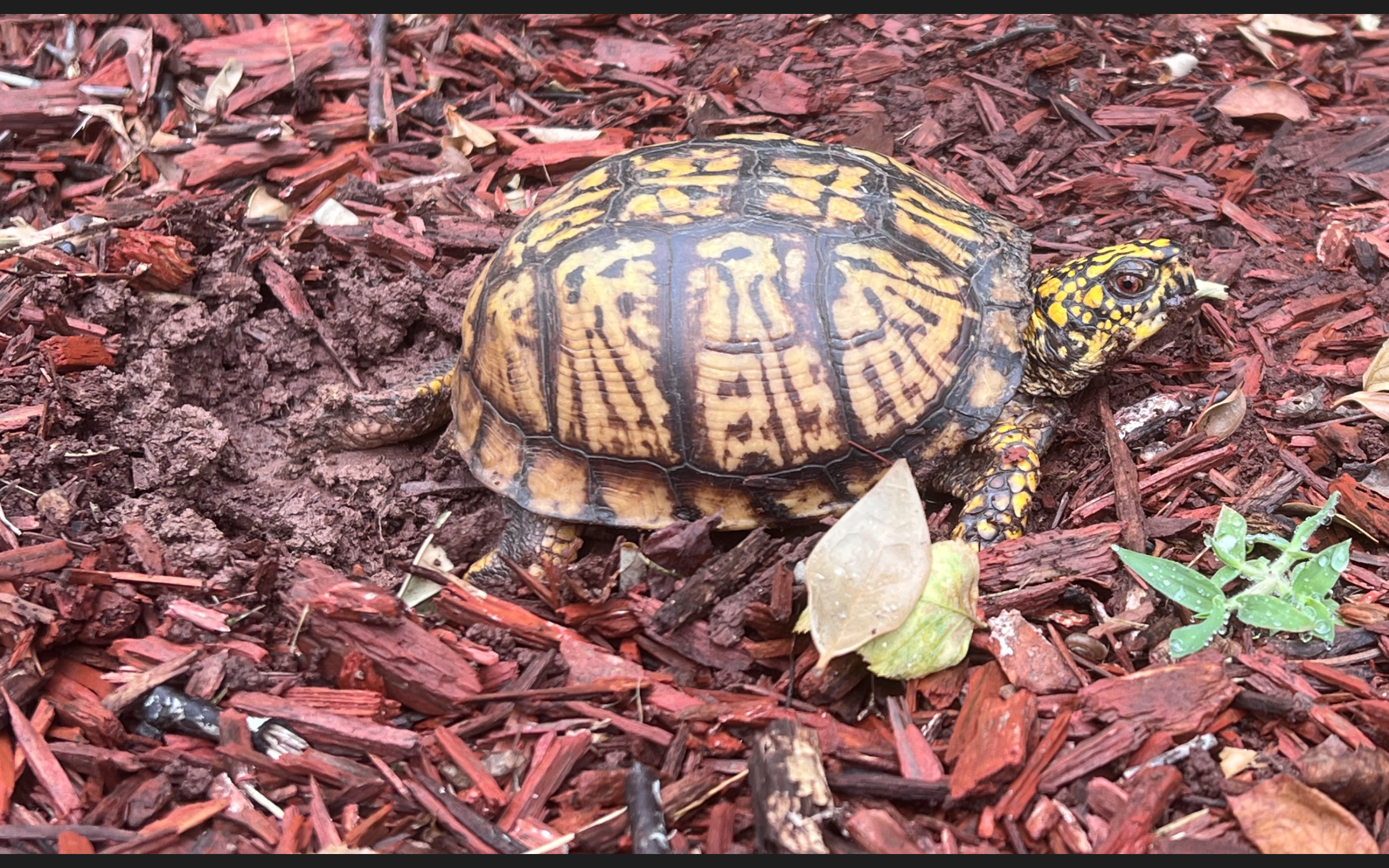
Female digging a hole with her back legs to lay eggs

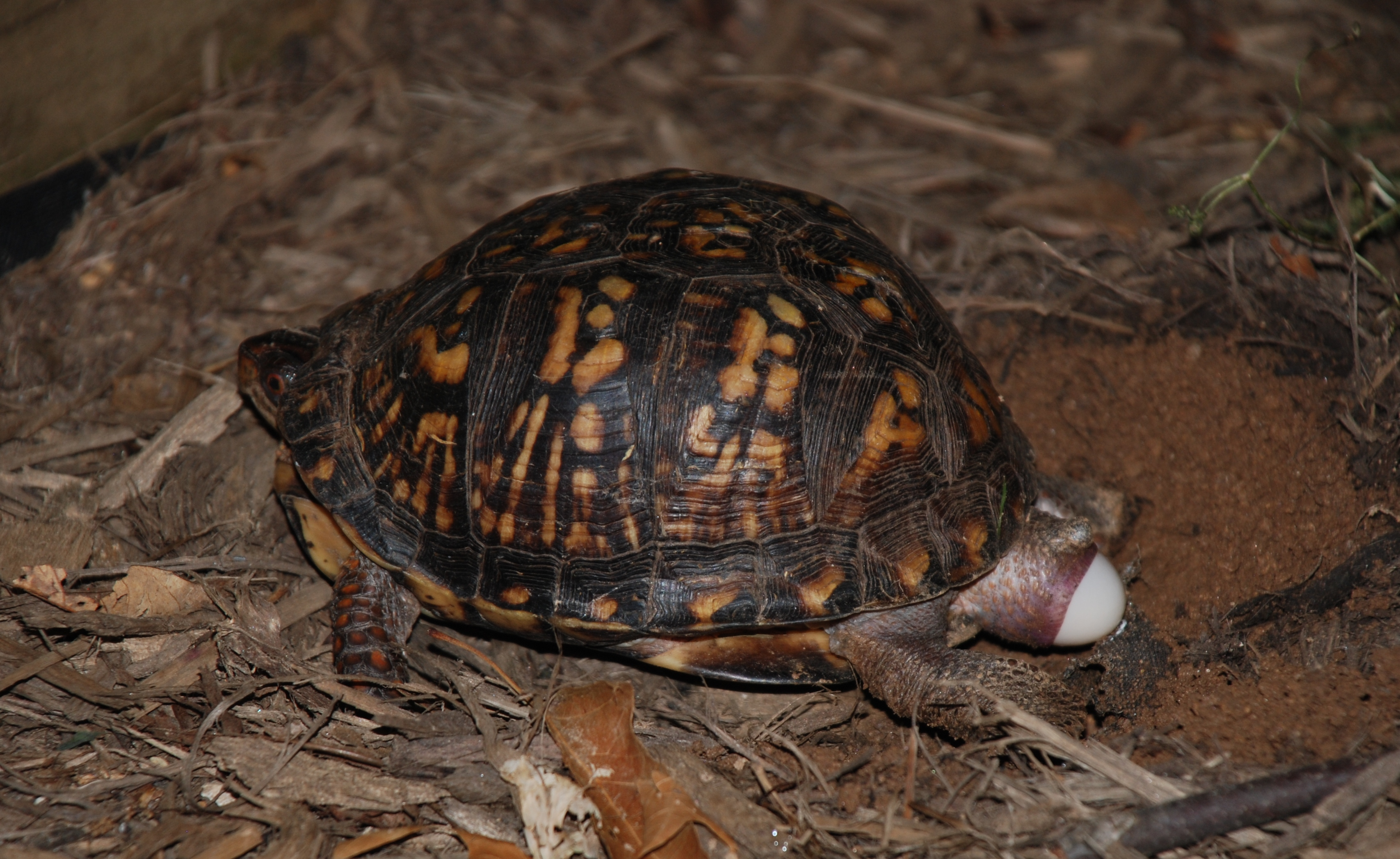
Laying eggs, in Virginia

== Captivity ==
Thousands of box turtles are collected from the wild every year for the domestic pet trade, although there are captive-bred individuals available. Buying a pet box turtle captive-bred rather than wild-caught helps discourage collection from the wild and helps preserve wild populations. The eastern box turtle is protected throughout most of its range, but many states allow the capture and possession of box turtles for personal use. Captive breeding is fairly commonplace, but not so much that it can supply the market demand.

Captive turtles may have a life span as short as three days if they are not fed, watered, and held in a proper container. Although box turtles may make hardy captives if their needs are met, and are frequently kept as pets, they are not easy turtles to keep, owing to their many specific requirements. Eastern box turtles require high humidity, warm temperatures with vertical and horizontal thermal gradients, suitable substrate for burrowing, and a T5 HO fluorescent UVB lamp of appropriate strength. A basking area at one end of the enclosure is important to offer the turtle the ability to warm itself and is critical to sexually mature males and females for development of sperm and egg follicles, respectively.

Water should be fresh and clean and available at all times. A large, easily accessible water dish for bathing and drinking is important to their health.

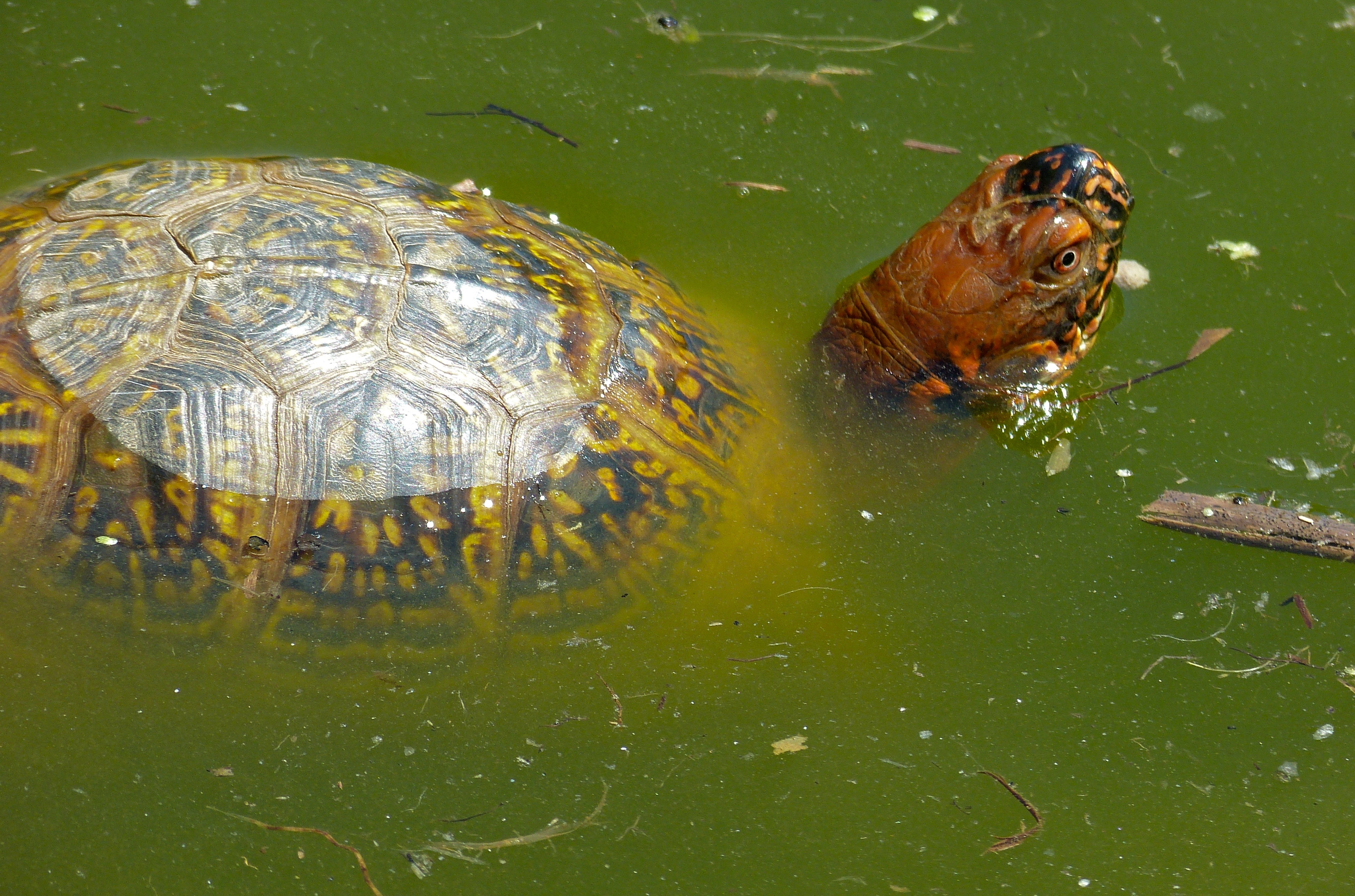
Swimming in captivity

Captive diets include various live invertebrates such as crickets, worms, earthworms, beetles and grubs (beetle larvae), cockroaches, small mice as well as wild strawberries, and fish (not goldfish). Mixed berries, fruit, romaine lettuce, collard greens, dandelion greens, chicory, mushrooms and clover are suitable for box turtles as well. While some high quality moist dog foods may be occasionally offered, whole animals are preferable. Commercial diets such as Reptilinks, Mazuri Tortoise Diet, Repashy Veggie Burger, and Arcadia OmniGold can be used for variety and additional nutrition. Because box turtles seldom get the nutrients they need to foster shell growth and skeletal and skin development, they also require a multivitamin supplement and access to a cuttlebone for calcium.

The vivid shell color found in many eastern box turtles often fades when a turtle is brought into captivity. This has led to the mistaken belief that the color fades as the turtle ages. Insufficient access to full sunlight is likely to cause the color in the keratin layer to fade. In addition to providing UVB lighting, providing a varied diet complete with a carotenoid supplement can help sustain a pet's vibrant colors.

In captivity, box turtles are known to be capable of living over 100 years, but in the wild, often live much shorter lives due to disease and predation.

== Conservation ==
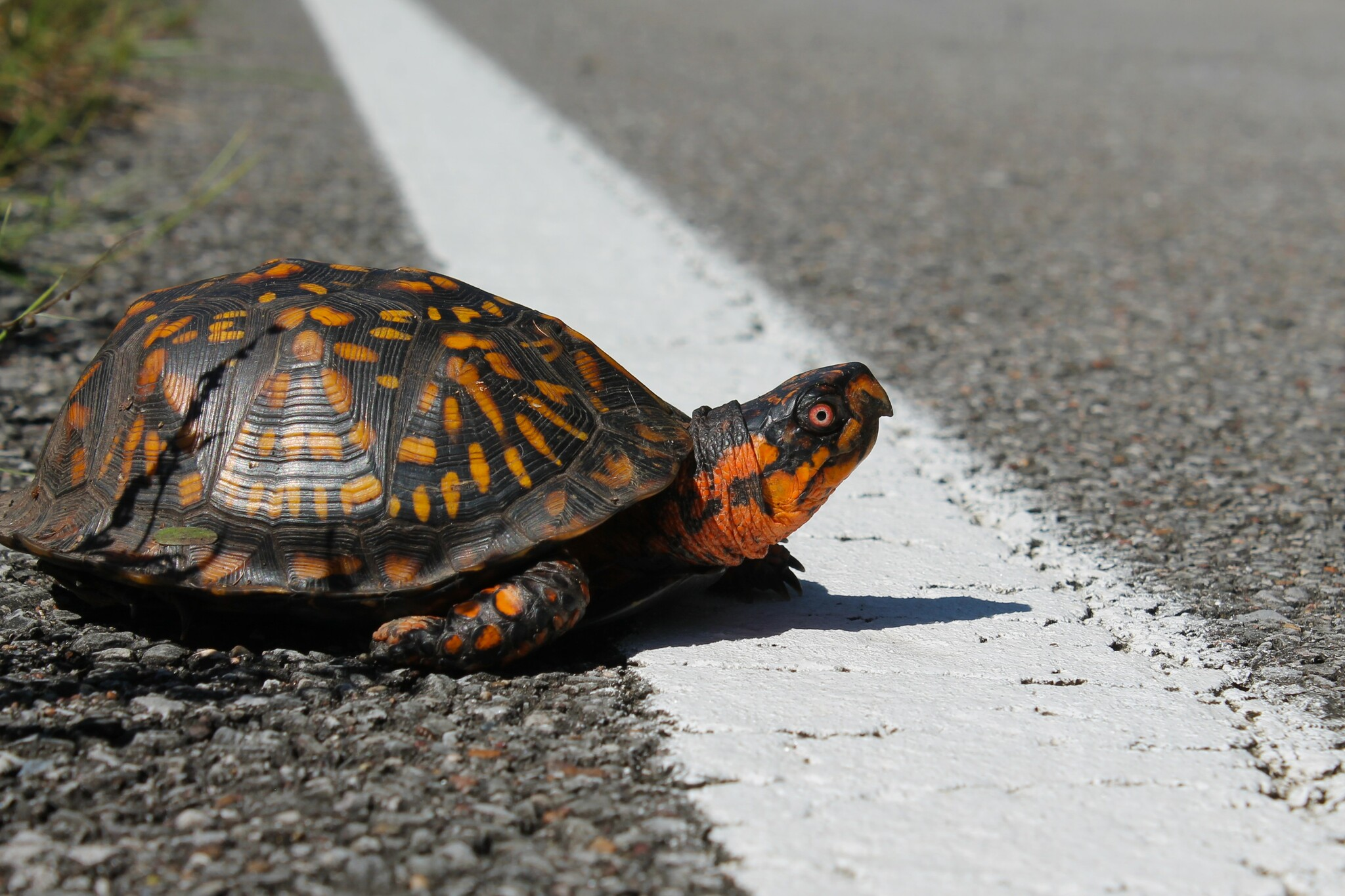
Crossing a road, in Tennessee

Eastern box turtles are listed as vulnerable on the IUCN Species Red List. They are currently fairly common, especially in the southern part of their range, but many populations are declining rapidly. It is predicted that they will predominate in their more northern habitats. Habitat loss, degradation, and fragmentation caused by urbanization or other human use is the main cause of this species' vulnerability. Eastern box turtles have also been found in urbanized areas where they are threatened by collisions with vehicles, mowing activity, and people removing them from the wild either out of a concern for the turtles' safety or to keep them as pets. Eastern box turtles are slow-moving and tend to take shelter in leaf litter, making them particularly vulnerable to fires, both human-made or natural. Diseases are another factor that threaten eastern box turtles. Ranaviruses, for example, have been found in eastern box turtles in Illinois since 2014.

== State reptiles ==
"The turtle watches undisturbed as countless generations of faster 'hares' run by to quick oblivion, and is thus a model of patience for mankind, and a symbol of our State's unrelenting pursuit of great and lofty goals."

— North Carolina Secretary of State

The eastern box turtle is the official state reptile of two U.S. states: North Carolina (which gives rise to the species and subspecies name carolina carolina) and Tennessee. In Pennsylvania, the eastern box turtle made it through one house of the legislature, but failed to win final naming in 2009. In Virginia, bills to honor the eastern box turtle failed in 1999 and then in 2009; a core reason is the creature's close links to North Carolina.

== Gallery ==
Adult male, eastern box turtle

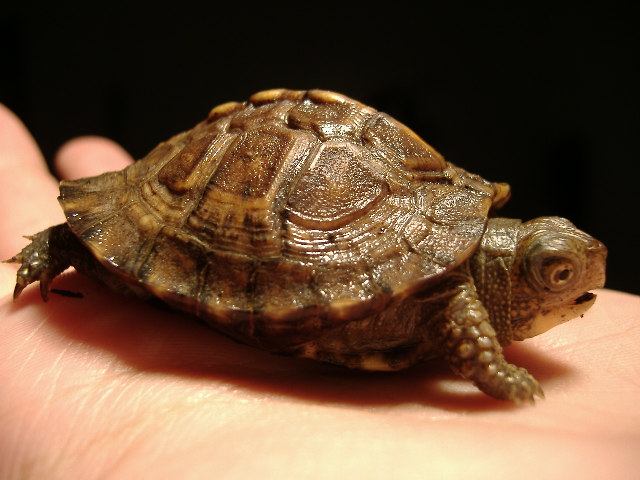
Young box turtle

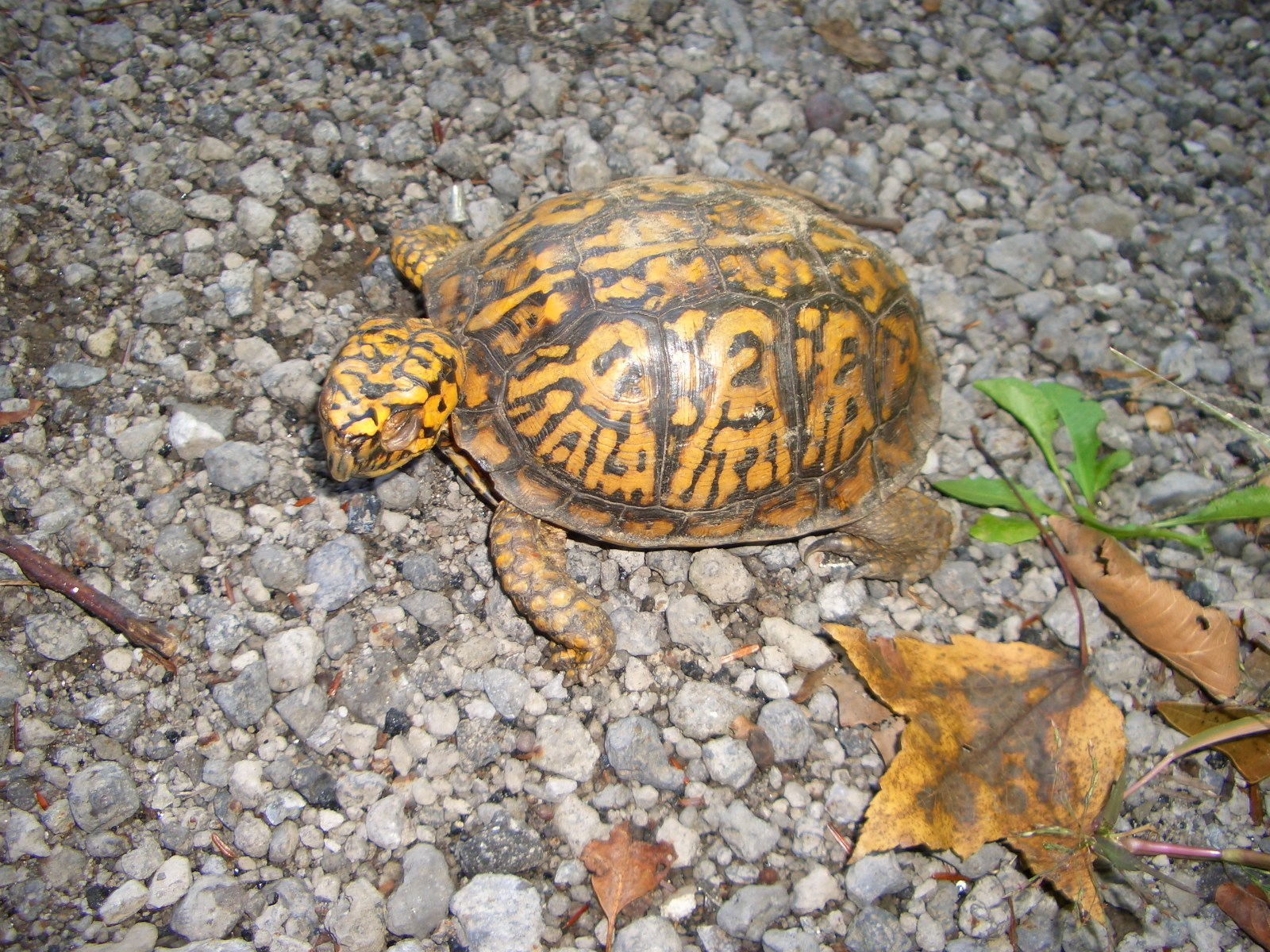
Tomlinson Run State Park, West Virginia

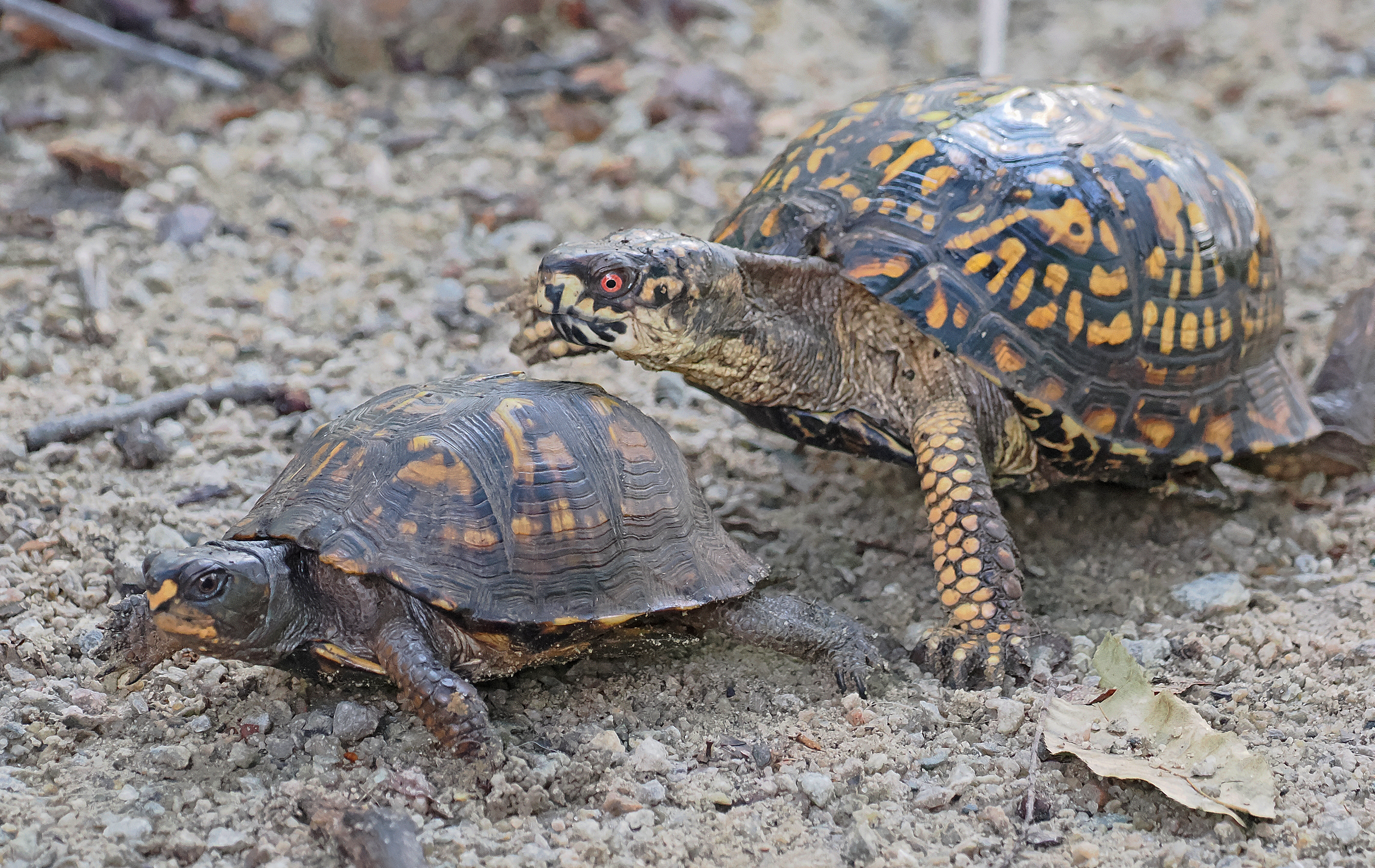
Male chasing a female, in Virginia

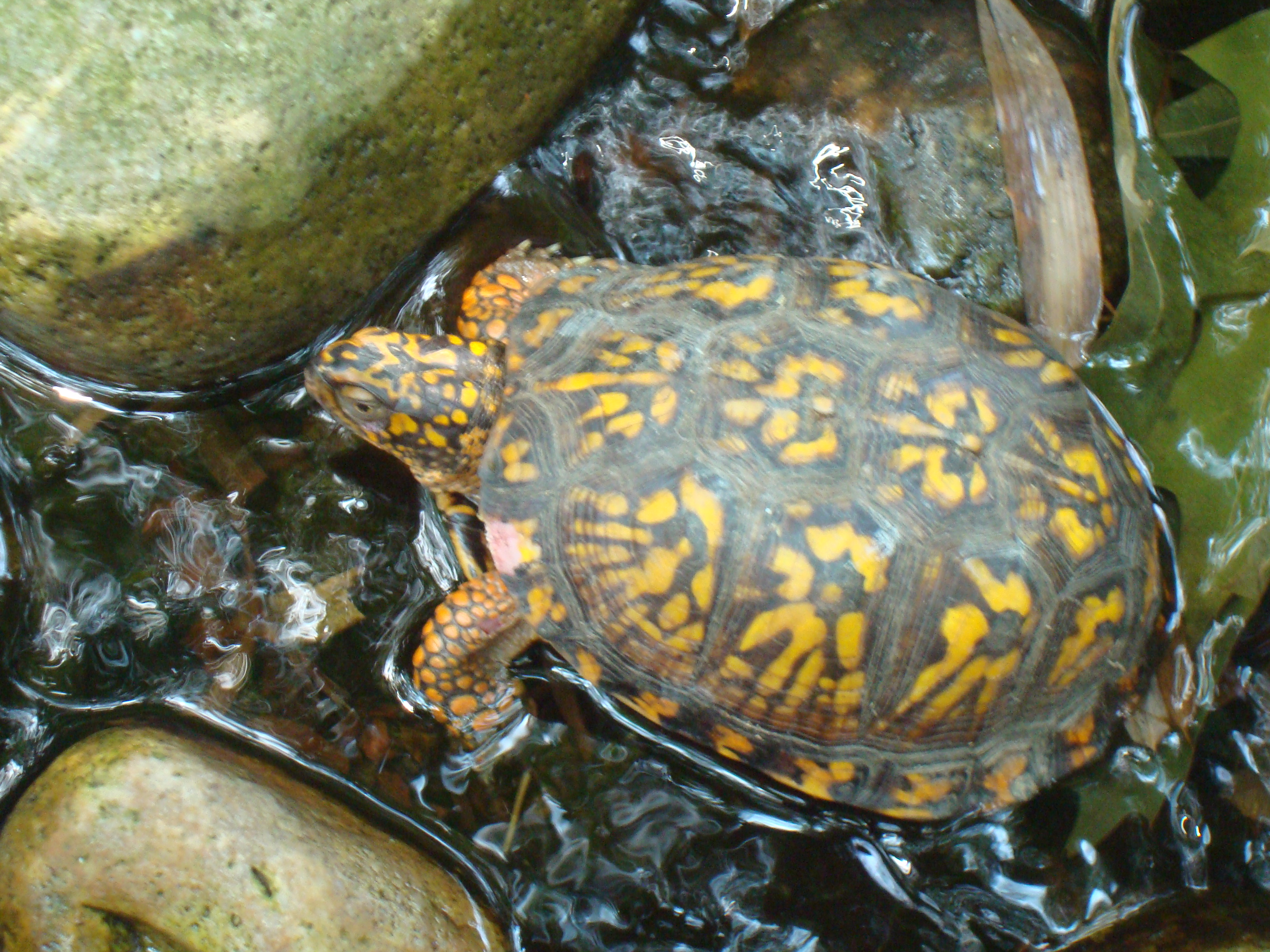

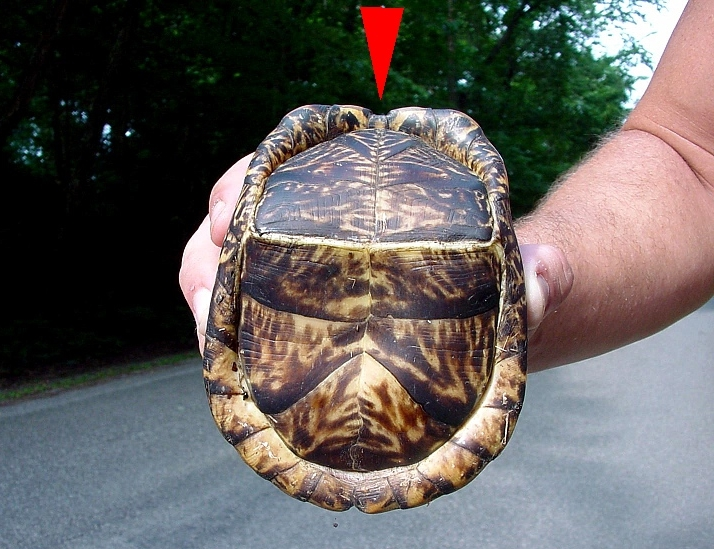
Plastron fully closed

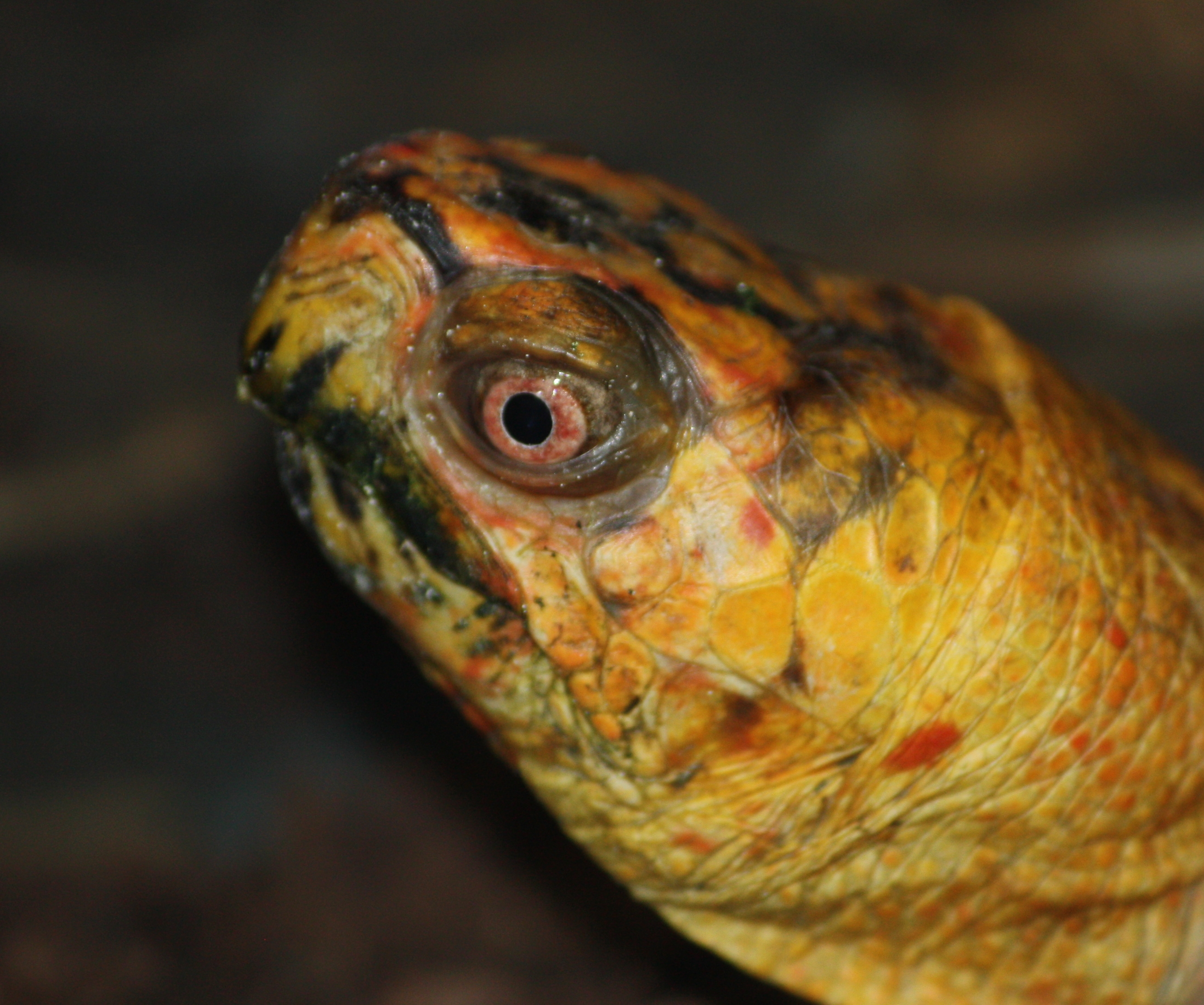
T. c. carolina at the Louisville Zoo

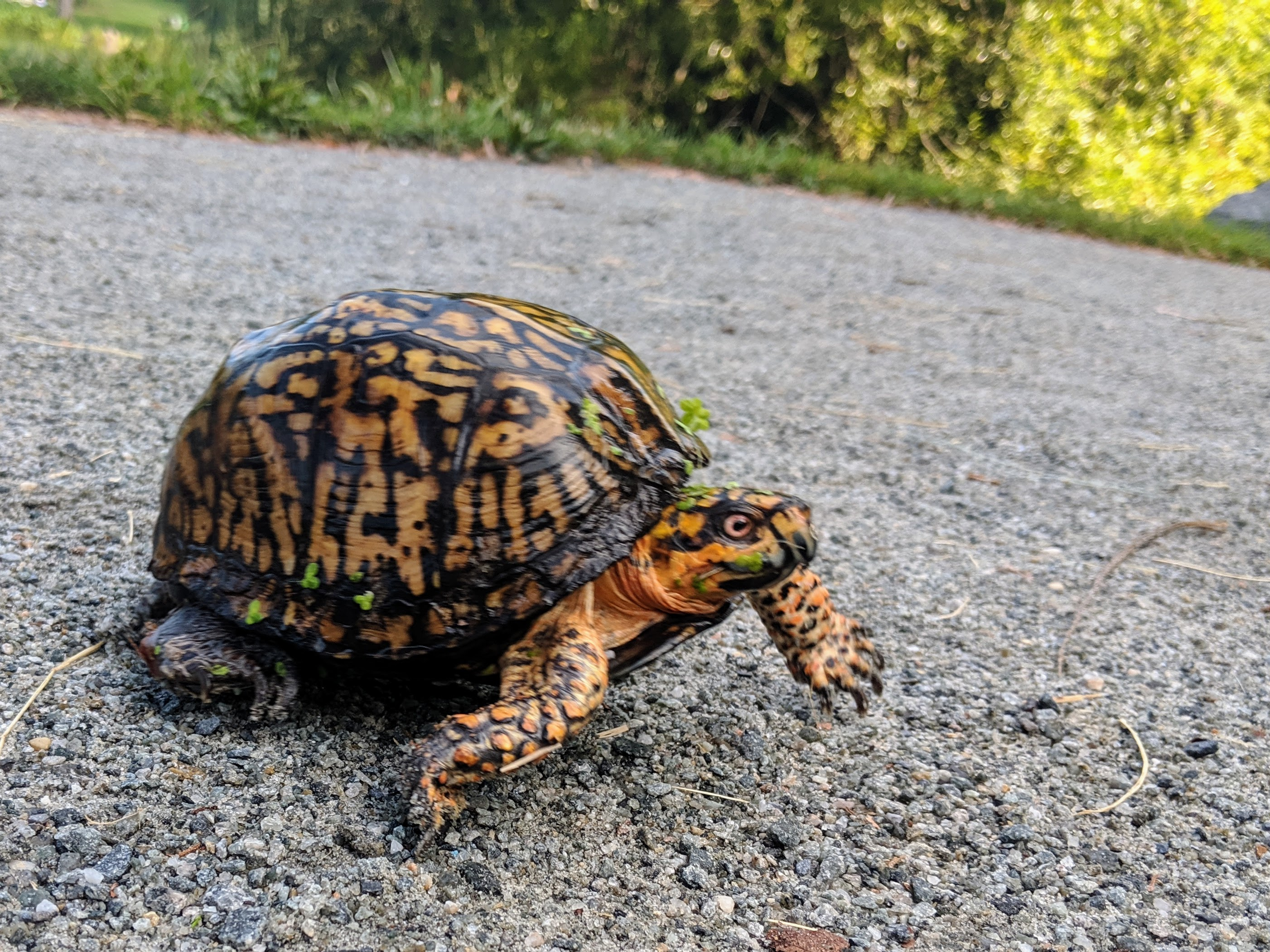
A female in Central Park, New York City

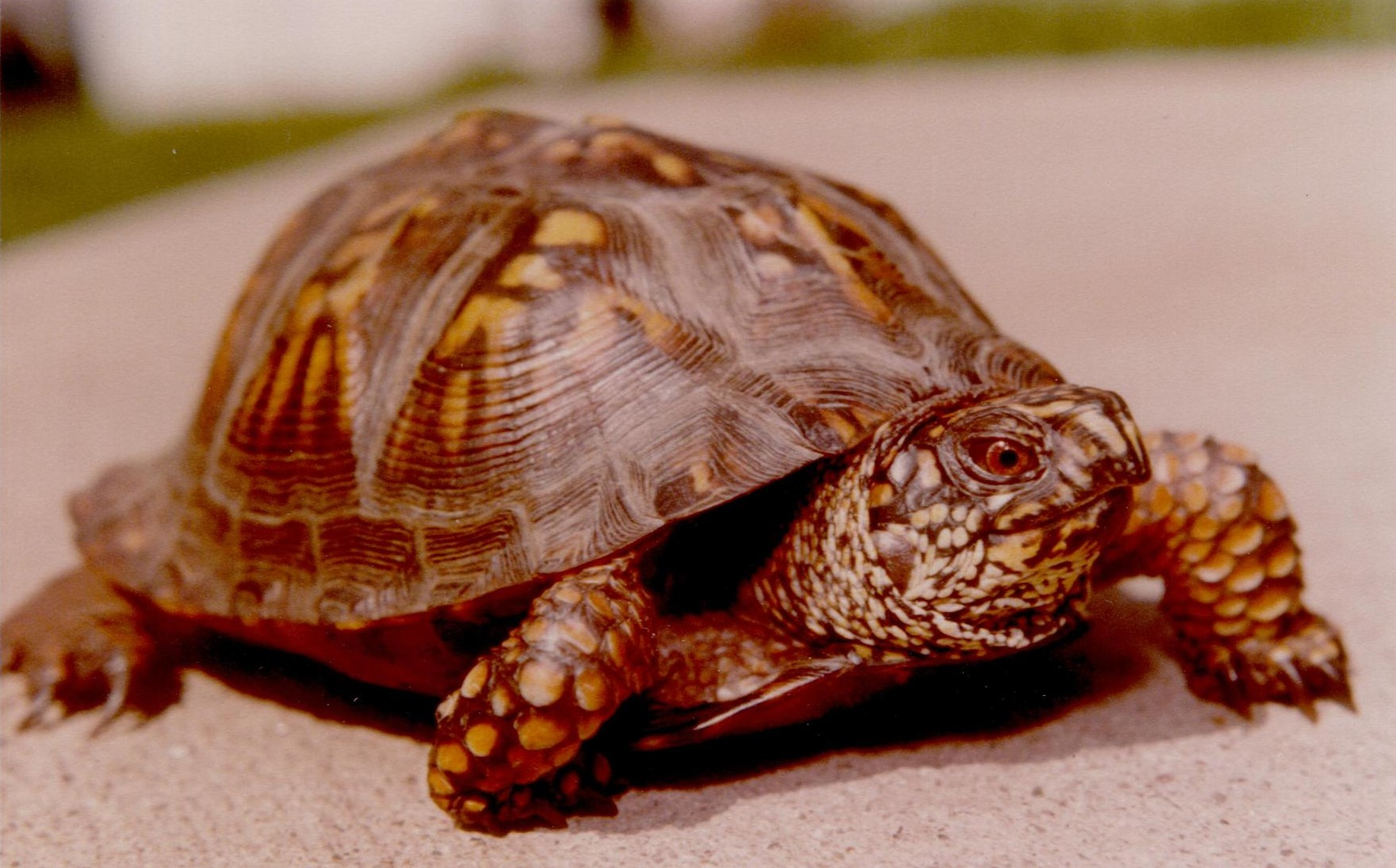
Male in southwestern Pennsylvania, June 30, 1979

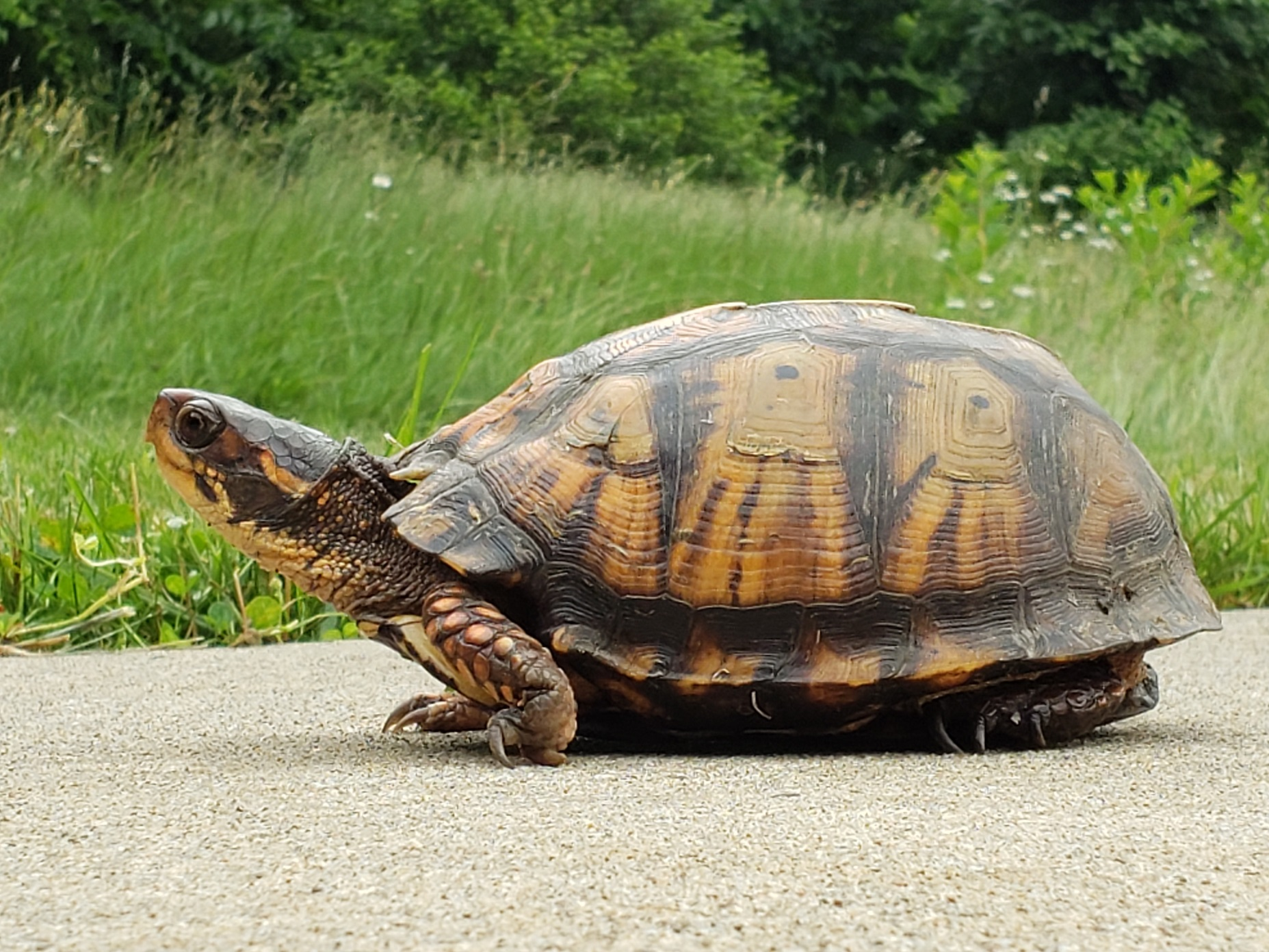
Older female with a worn and weathered shell in western Pennsylvania

== Notable individual animals ==
- Rockalina
