= Project Udayak =

Military engineering project

Udayak
- Founded: 1 June 1990; 36 years ago
- Country: India
- Type: Army, Engineering
- Role: Construction and maintenance of infrastructure in Eastern Arunachal Pradesh, focusing in development of ICBRs and the Bharatmala project.
- Headquarters: Doomdooma, Assam, India
- Motto: Shramena Sarvam Sadhyam
- Anniversaries: BRO Day: 7 May; Raising Day: 1 June
- Website: https://bro.gov.in

Commanders
- Director General: Lieutenant general Raghu Srinivasan
- Chief Engineer: Rajiv Sharma

Udayak, also known as Project UDAYAK, is a project of the Border Roads Organisation under the Ministry of Defence of India. It was established on 1 June 1990 by separating two task forces from Project Vartak and Project Sewak. The project was tasked with taking on road and other construction work in the eastern districts of Arunachal Pradesh. The project mainly focuses on the construction and development of India–China Border Roads and inter-valley connectivity in eastern Aruanchal Pradesh. The project plays a vital role in the Arunachal Pradesh package of the SARDP-NE project and the Bharatmala project. Apart from these, the project also contributes in the social development of the people in the region.

== History ==
In the 1980s, Project Vartak consisted of five Border Roads Task forces (BRTF) while Project Sewak had 4 BRTFs. To improve command and control of the units, a new project was sanctioned by the government on 23 May 1989 after which Udayak was established on 1 June 1990. The headquarters was chosen to be Doomdooma in the Tinsukia district of Assam. The project was established in a period of heightened civil unrest and insurgency in North-east India. The 48 BRTF was stationed in Kimin while 752 BRTF was stationed in Kohima before their induction in Project Udayak. Colonel P.K. Chowdhury was appointed as the first chief engineer of the project.

== Command Structure ==
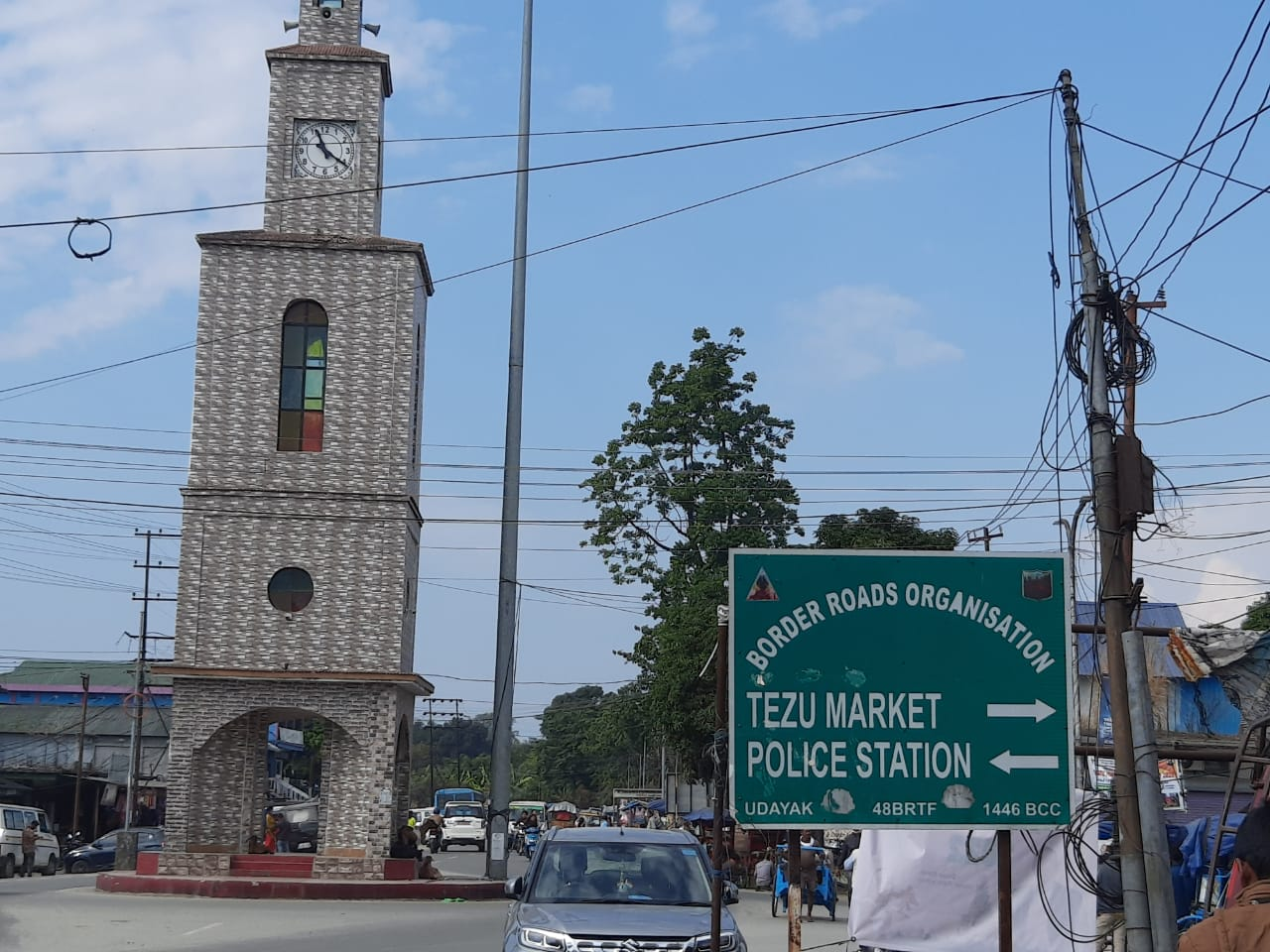
A road sign in the city centre of Tezu by Udayak

The project is mainly divided into 48th task force currently stationed near Tezu in Lohit district and the 752nd task force in Roing, Lower Dibang Valley district. Both of these task forces include numerous companies which in turn include platoons and detachments. The task forces are headed by a commander while the companies are headed by an officer commanding.

== Works and involvements ==
Udayak maintains more than 2,100 kilometres (1,300 mi) of roads and numerous bridge infrastructure across the tough terrain of Eastern Arunachal Pradesh and some parts of Assam and Nagaland which include national highways, general staff roads which are in line with defence requirements and India-China border roads. The 48 BRTF undertakes road and bridge infrastructure works in the Lohit, Namsai, Anjaw and part of Lower Dibang districts of Arunachal Pradesh while the 752 BRTF undertakes works in Lower Dibang Valley, Dibang Valley district, Tirap and Changlang. Many of its units are air maintained by the Army Aviation Corps and Indian Air Force due to difficult terrain.

The project has played a major role in the development of the National Highway 15 and Dibrugarh Airport. It has also constructed buildings for Jawahar Navodaya Vidyalaya in Tissa of Longding district of Arunachal Pradesh and Chare of Tuensang district of Nagaland.

In 2010, the Comptroller and Auditor General of India found financial misappropriations and wasteful expenses in the proceedings of the project which was later notified to the Ministry of Defence.

The project also inaugurated the 720 metres (0.45 mi) Digaru bridge in the year 2012 connecting the Lohit district to the Lower Dibang valley district of Arunachal Pradesh which facilitates easy movement of locals as well as troops in the region.

In April 2018, a bridge collapsed in the Hayuliang-Changwanti road due to heavy rainfall cutting off numerous villages including the border town of Kibithu. Restoration work was initiated in collaboration with the National Highways and Infrastructure Development Corporation Limited (NHIDCL). Later in September the same year, a new steel bridge was constructed in the route by the project.

In 2019, former defence minister Nirmala Sitharaman inaugurated the Diffo bridge over the Diffo river on the Roing – Koronu- Paya road improving connectivity between the Dibang valley and Lohit valley region of Eastern Arunachal Pradesh. Former Director general of Border Roads Organisation Lieutenant Harpal Singh said that the bridge was built under tough conditions like flash floods where numerous workers lost their lives.

In 2020, the project completed the 65 metres (0.040 mi) long bridge over the Kramti river on the Changwanti-Walong-Namti route located 25 kilometres (16 mi) from Hawai.

In 2021, Udayak conducted a free health camp in the Choephelling Tibetan Settlement located in the Changlang district of Arunachal Pradesh, which is administered by the Central Tibetan Administration. The former Chief Engineer of Udayak, Vimal Goswami, promised the settlement office that the health camp would continue every week until a new medical facility is established.

Under an 'exhibition of best practices' organised by the Ministry of Defence, the project in 2022 resurfaced 1 kilometre (0.62 mi) of the Roing-Koronu-Paya road with shredded plastic in the asphalt concrete road construction process.

In May 2023, the project established connectivity to the village of Tapatuwi on the Chaglohagam-Rocham Road. The project already had an air-maintained unit in the village since 2019. The hard rocky strata prevented from establishing road connectivity. The task encountered resistance from the locals and the Arunachal Pradesh Youth Congress (APYC) in 2020 due to non-receipt of land compensation payments and alleged errors in land acquisition. It was later found that the project had sanctioned a payment of INR 24 crores but corruption was seen in the compensation disbursement process by local officials of the Government of Arunachal Pradesh.

In August 2023, the project inaugurated a bailey bridge over the 'Tha Nala' located 24 kilometres (15 mi) from Chaglohagam. The 'Tha Nala' was regularly affected by floods after rain which caused issues in the smooth movement of locals and troops through the area. The local mishmi population appreciated the efforts by the project.

== See also ==
- Project Shivalik
- Project Dantak
- Project Himank
