= Project Himank =

Civil infrastructure project in Ladakh, India

Himank
- Founded: 4 December 1985; 40 years ago
- Country: India
- Type: Army, Engineering
- Role: To construct and maintain motorable roads in Ladakh along the Line of Actual Control
- Headquarters: Leh, Ladakh, India
- Nickname: The Mountain Tamers
- Motto: Shramena Sarvam Sadhyam
- Anniversaries: Raising Day: 05 December; BRO Day: 7 May
- Website: bro.gov.in

Commanders
- Director General: Lt. Gen. Raghu Srinivasan
- Chief Engineer: Brigadier Vishal Srivastava

Himank, also known as Project HIMANK, is a project of the Border Roads Organisation under the Ministry of Defence of India. It was established in August 1985 to facilitate the construction of road infrastructure in Ladakh and parts of Jammu and Kashmir under the India–China Border Roads project. The project is also involved in providing all year access to military bases and outposts in Siachen glacier, along the Line of actual control and areas near the Pangong Tso lake.

It has constructed the highest motorable road in the world at Umling La at height of 19,300 feet (5,900 m) along with roads in Khardung La, Tanglang La and Chang La. The project also provided access from Leh to Kargil during the Kargil War in May 1999. Its work in some locations is constrained to only a few months in a year due to extreme climatic conditions. The project undertakes snow clearance works every year to keep major roads in strategic area in Ladakh open during winters.

== Command structure ==
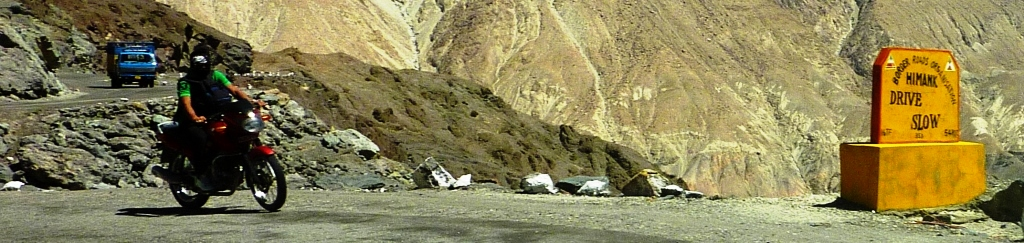
Drive Slow sign by Himank in the Nubra Valley, Ladakh, India.

The project is divided mainly into the 16th task force, 753rd task force and 50th task forces which facilitates works in the areas of Spituk, Thiksey and Durbok respectively. Both of these task forces include numerous companies which in turn include platoons and detachments. Project Himank is led by a Chief Engineer of Brigadier rank. The task forces are headed by a commander of Colonel rank, while the companies are headed by an officer commanding, usually of Major rank.

== Major works ==
The project has connected numerous villages and townships including Chisumle and Demchok with the highest motorable Umling La road. In 2016, the project constructed two strategic bridges namely the Himank Setu and Tsultak Bridge across the Shyok river and Phiya Lung Nallah respectively. The project has constructed and maintains the Darbuk–Shyok–DBO Road which leads to Daulat Beg Oldi, a military base along the line of actual control. The construction of a new tunnel along the DBO road is also under progress.

The construction of the Sasoma–Saser La Road on the Siachen glacier and Likaru-Mig La-Fukche road at an altitude of 19,400 feet (5,900 m) is also underway. The construction is possible for a short period of time every year due to extreme cold and geographical challenges. The project has also experimented the construction of plastic roads using waste low-density polyethylene, high-density polyethylene, polyethylene terephthalate, and polyurethane. The project is also constructing a 3D printed air despatch unit in Chandigarh airport which aims to provide logistical support to the project.

== Road signs ==
Project HIMANK is known to install humorous road signs along roads in Ladakh, photos of which are the subject of the book Peep Peep Don't Sleep. Signboards, notably those in the Nubra Valley, offer philosophical statements from singer Patti LaBelle, French author Jules Renard, singer-songwriter Jimmy Buffett and early Zionist Jessie Sampter.

== Photo gallery ==
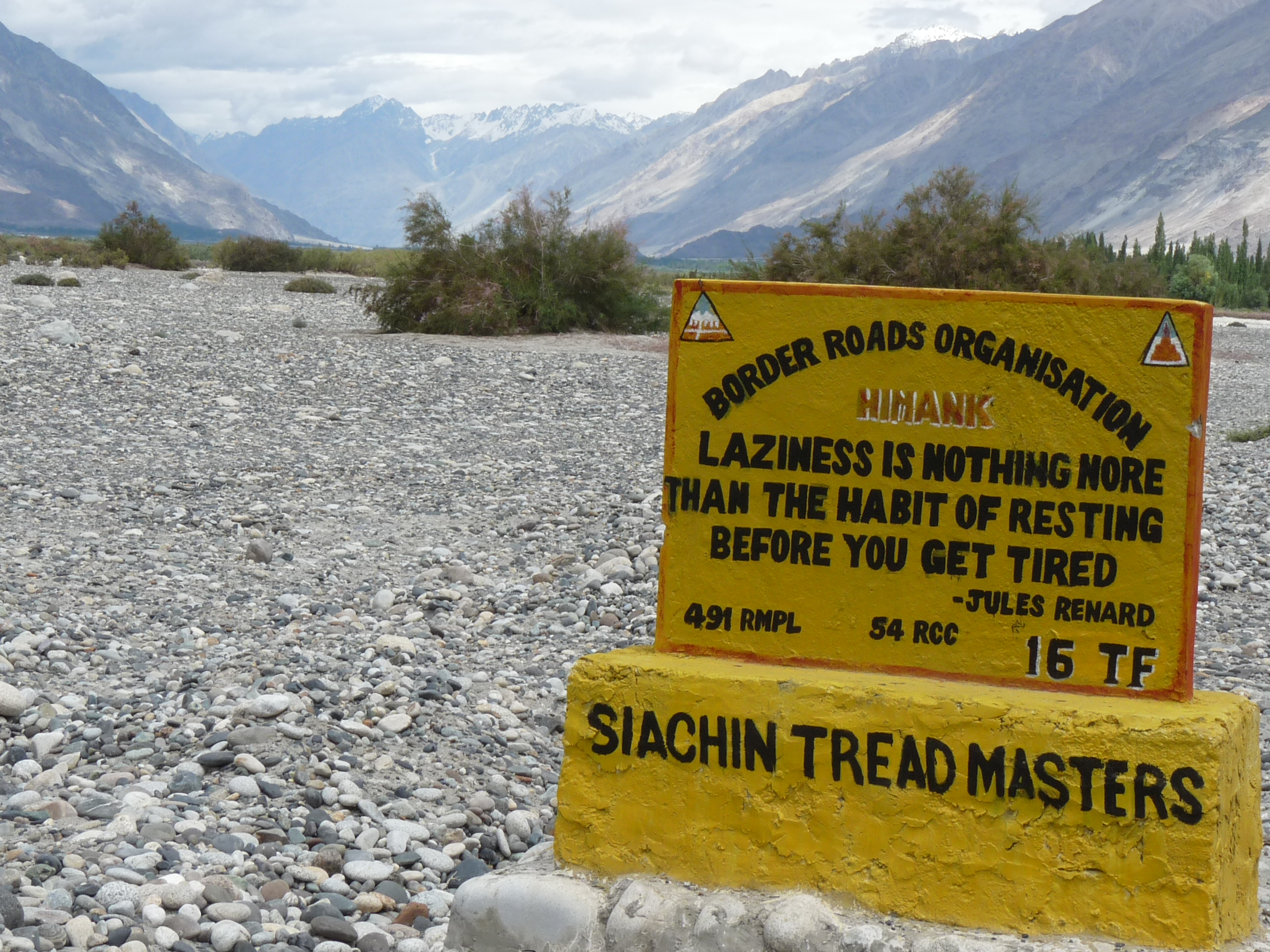

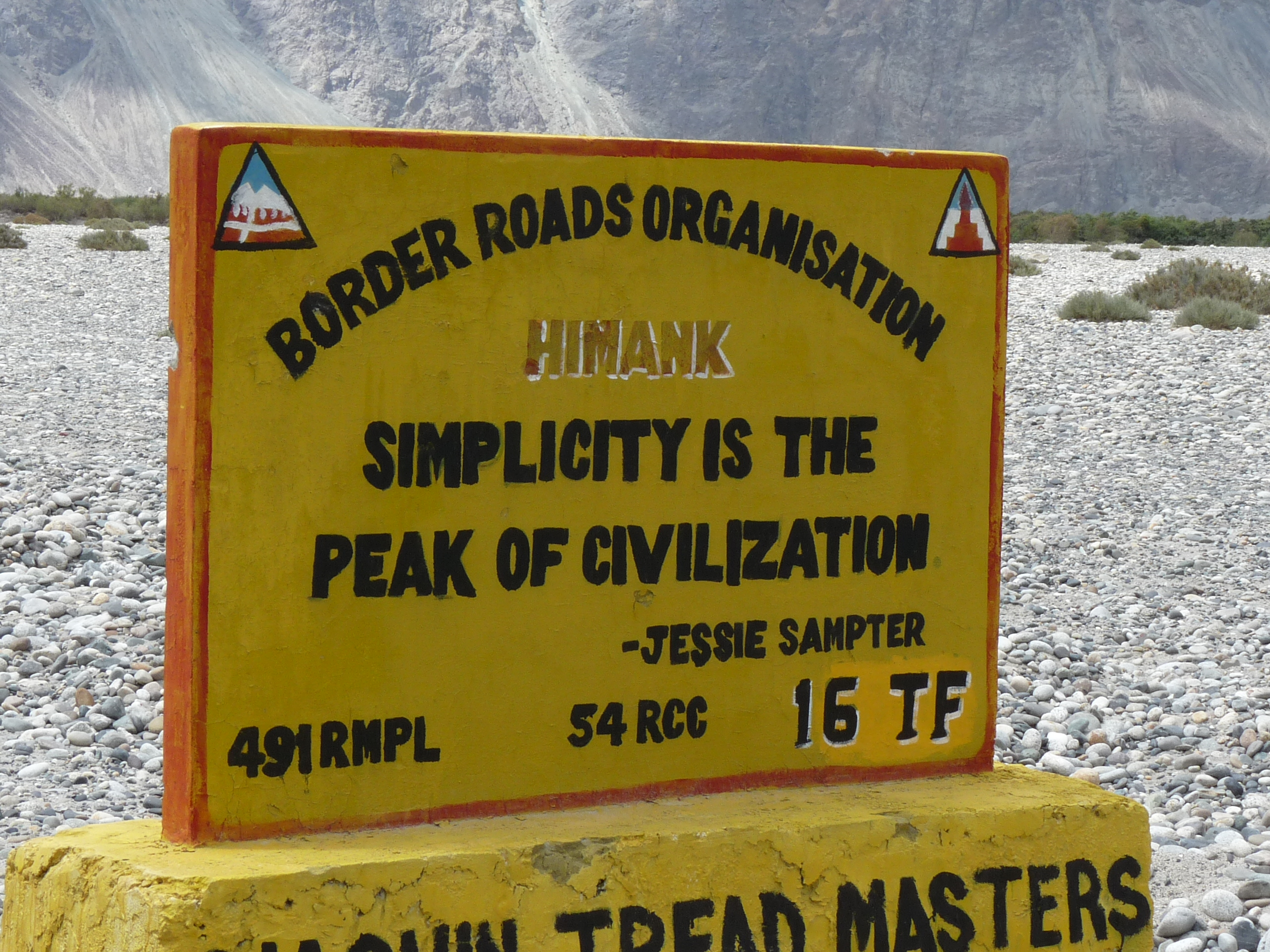

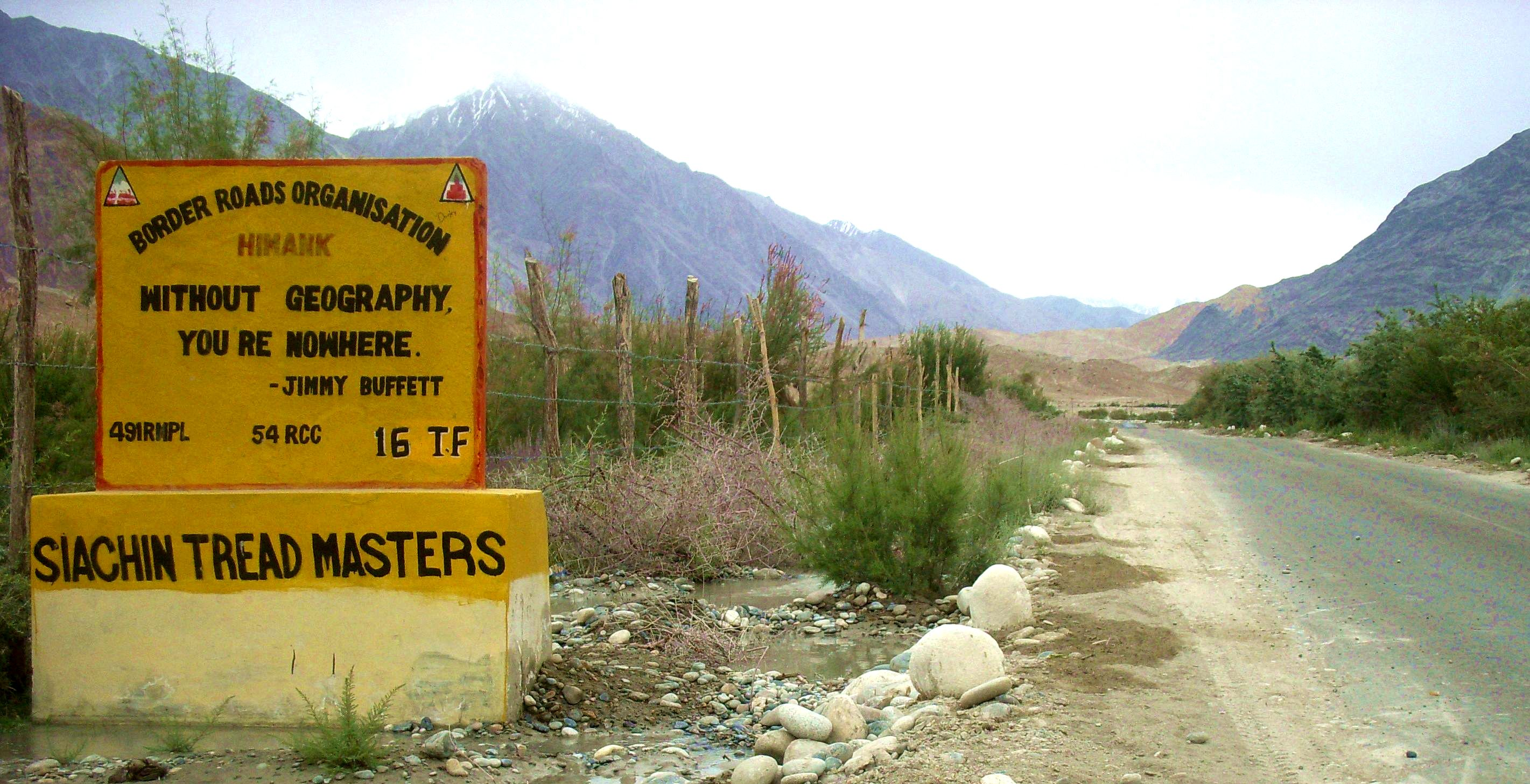

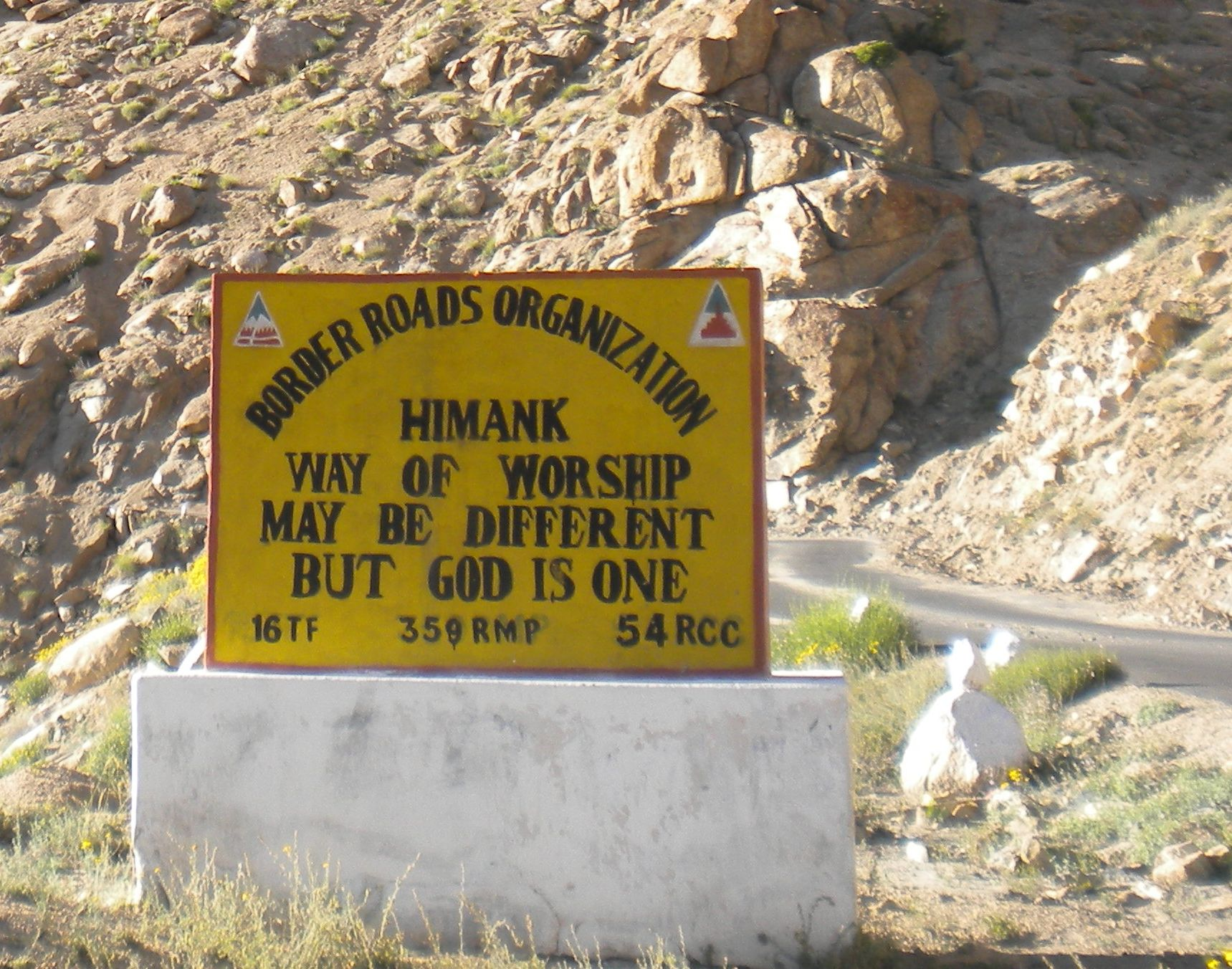

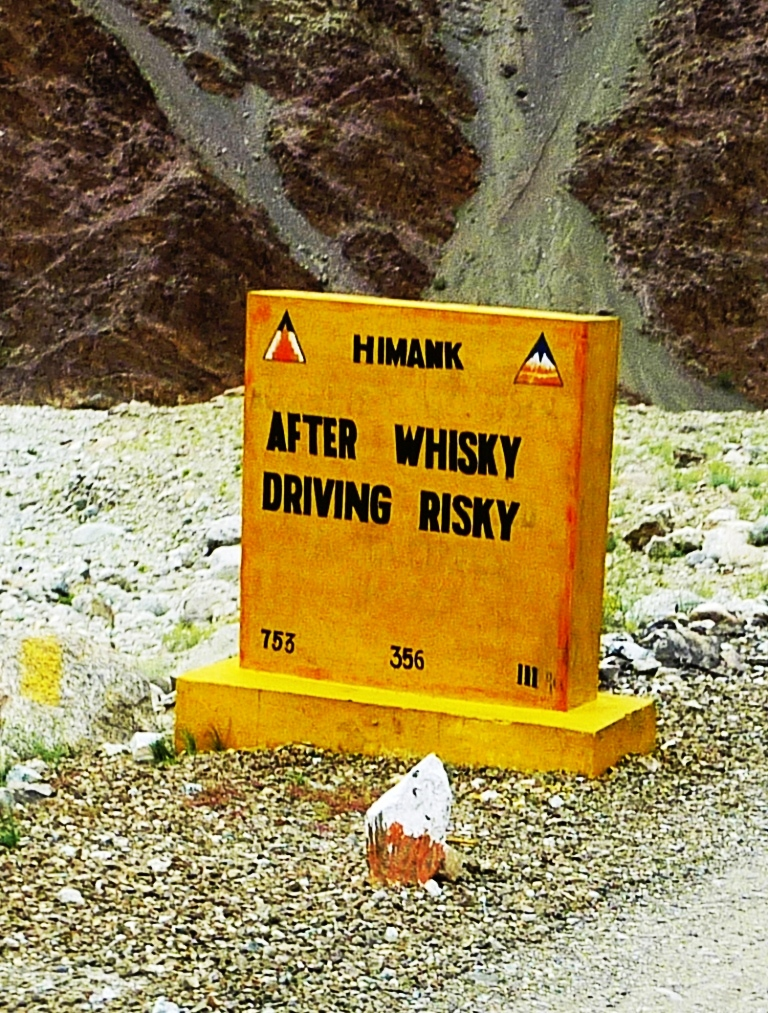

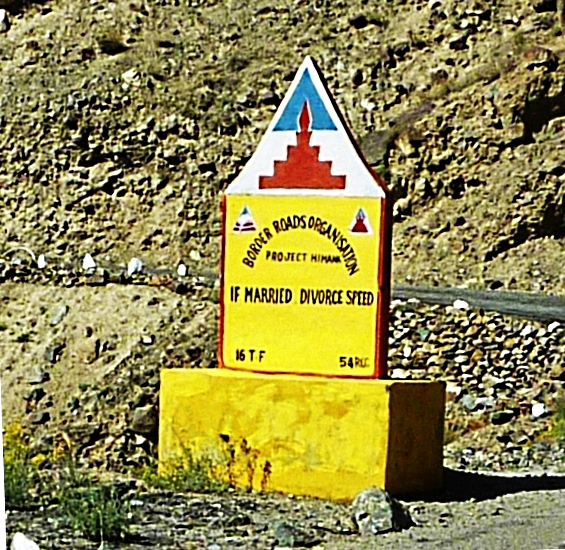

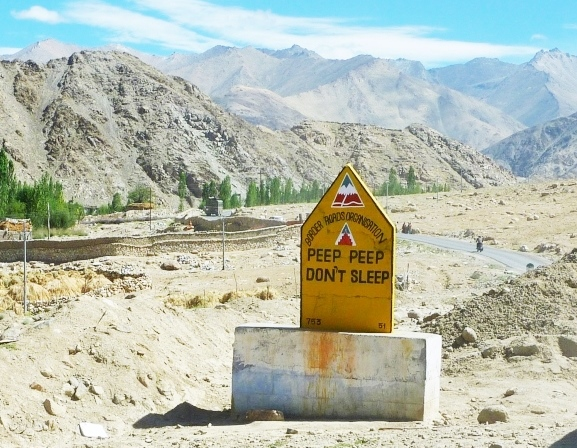

== See also ==
- Project Vartak
- Project Dantak
- Project Shivalik
