= Deothang =

Dewathang, also known as Deothang, is a town in south-eastern Bhutan under Samdrup Jongkhar District.

== History ==
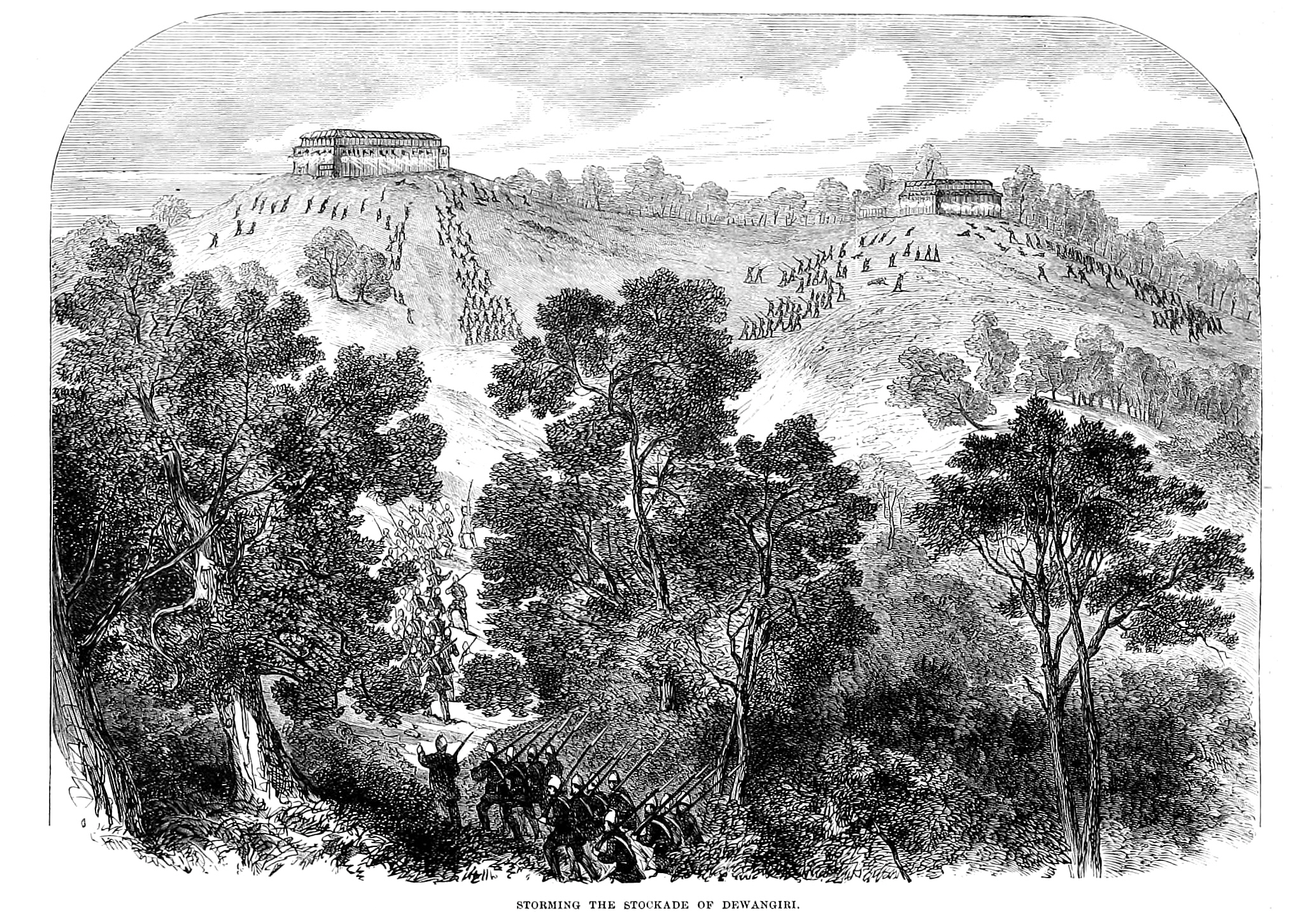
Artist depiction of Dewangiri

Map depicting Dewathang under India erroneously in 1965

Dewangiri (Note: The Anglicized or Assamese name historically used in English) was a site of conflict in the Duar War, having changed hands between the British and Bhutanese on 10th December 1864, 29th January and 2nd April 1895. With the territory being ceded to British Raj following the Treaty of Sinchula. It was used only for winter grazing of Bhutanese animals for an annual fee to British Raj and later India. In 1951, the Dewangiri area that now formed the northern part of Kamrup, measuring 32 square miles (83 km^{2}), was ceded to Bhutan in accordance to an article of the Indo-Bhutan Treaty of 1949.

Dewathang was established as a town in the 1960s during the construction of the Samdrup Jongkhar-Trashigang highway (PNH 03) along with Samdrup Jongkhar. In 1961, the Border Roads Organization would establish their headquarters in the settlement, only leaving in 1997 to Thimphu.

In 2003, Dewathang would be used as a base of operations in Operation All Clear. In 2005, Dewathang would be identifed as a Yenlag thromde. In 2010 it became part of Samdrup Jongkhar thromde.

== Geography ==
Dewathang is located in Samdrup Jongkhar District at an altitude of 870 metres (2855 feet). It is 18 km away from the Dzongkhag Administration. The Gewog is bordered by Orong Gewog in the North, Phuntshothang Gewog in the East, Pemagatshel Dzongkhag in the West and Assam in the South. The Dewri river is located north of Dewathang.

== Demographics ==
In the 2005 Census, the population was 2,644. The median literacy rate in 2019 was 74.54%, with men at 73.19% and women at 50.55%. The median monthly household income (Nu/month) was 40,016. The predominant language spoken is Tshangla.

== Economy ==
Dewathang is primarily a market town, with the nearby villages predominantly growing Ginger for a Spring and Winter harvest. Samdrup Jongkhar Craft Market is located in Dewathang, predominantly relying on tourism.

== Governance ==
Dewathang is divided into three Demkhongs under Samdrup Jongkhar, namely Samdrup Gatshel, Kipse and Bangtsho that elect a Thueme to the city council. All Thuemes are non-partisan. The Royal Bhutan Army own portion of land in Bangtsho Demkhong. Dewathang is the seat of Dewathang Gewog.

== Landmarks ==
DANTAK Memorial is a memorial built in 1967 that was commissioned by Jigme Dorji Wangchuck to commemorate Project Dantak.

Lungta Phodrang Lhakhang is a monastery build in 2014 under Jigme Khesar Namgyel Wangchuck.

Singye Choeling Tshuglhakhang is a monastery in Gayzor build in 2025 by the Je Khenpo to celebrate the 70th birth anniversary of Jigme Singye Wangchuck.

== Infrastructure ==
Dewathang is served by the Samdrp Jongkhar City Bus Service with a route connecting it to Samdrup Jongkhar.

Jigme Dorji Wangchuck Military Hospital, built in 1965 as Dewathang Military Hospital is a government hospital under the Royal Bhutan Army in Dewathang.

It is served by the Samdrup Jongkhar-Trashigang Highway, it's connected to Samdrupcholing by the Dewathang-Samdrup Choling highway which was constructed in 1979.

Its expected to be connected to Nganglam by the Nganglam-Dewathang highway, and to Jomotshangkha by the Jomotshangkha-Samrang highway, both projects under Project Dantak.

== Education ==
Jigme Namgyel Engineering College, a constituent college under the Royal University of Bhutan is located atop a hill at approximately 880 m above sea level. The college started in 1974 as Royal Bhutan Polytechnic was the only engineering college in Bhutan until 2001. It would become apart of Royal University of Bhutan in 2003.

Dewathang Primary School is a government public school built in 1962, it also contains a Early Childhood Care Development Centre.

Dungsam Academy is a private higher secondary school located near Gayzor village. It currently is the only private school in the district, having opened in 2013.

== Notable people ==
- Mingbo Dukpa - 3rd Minister of education
- Kezang Dorji - Rapper/Social Worker
