= Diffo Bridge =

Bridge in India

- Carries: 2 road lanes
- Crosses: Diffo river (Chimpu river)
- Locale: Tezu and Roing
- Maintained by: Border Road Organization

Characteristics
- Design: Pre-stressed concrete box girder bridge
- Material: Concrete
- Total length: 426.60 m (1,399.6 ft)

History
- Constructed by: Border Road Organization
- Construction start: 2011
- Construction end: 2019
- Opened: 18 Jan 2019; 7 years ago

Statistics
- Toll: Free both ways

Diffo Bridge is a pre-stressed concrete box girder bridge over the Diffo river (Chipu river) in Arunachal Pradesh, India. This 426.60 metres (1,399.6 ft) long bridge was inaugurated in 2019 by the Union Defense Minister Nirmala Sitharaman.

== Construction ==
The construction started in 2011 by Border Roads Organisation under Project Udayak. It was built for an estimated cost of ₹4,847.83 lakh (US$5.1 million), which was funded by the Union Ministry of Road Transport and Highways. Tough working conditions in an inhospitable terrain facing turbulent flash floods, made construction difficult. It was completed in 8 years. The bridge was inaugurated by the Union Defense Minister Nirmala Sitharaman on 18 January 2019.

== Significance ==
Earlier, Indian Defense Forces had laid the Bailey bridge over the Diffo River. It was a temporary structure that had to be closed during most rains. The new bridge provides uninterrupted access between Dibang Valley and Lohit valley of Eastern Arunachal Pradesh on Roing-Koron-Paya Road. Lohit valley is the corridor that leads to Kibithu, the battleground of the 1962 Indo-Sino war and Lower Dibang Valley leads to the Anini front of border with China. The bridge reduced traveling time between Tezu and Roing (district headquarters of Lohit Valley and Lower Dibang Valley respectively) from 3 hours to 45 minutes. During a monsoon, the old route took travelers through Assam. Strategically, it provides an all-weather route for troops deployed on the China border (the McMahon line).
