= Kanchan Ugursandi =

Indian motorcycle rider

Kanchan Ugursandi is an Indian adventurer and motorcycle rider. She is affectionately nicknamed as Border Girl and Bike Girl. Kanchan has ridden her motorbike to scale 22 Himalayan passes (including the world's "highest altitude road") and zero points on borders across various states of India including Ladakh, Uttarakhand, Rajasthan, Gujarat, Punjab, Jammu and Kashmir and Himachal Pradesh.

== Biography ==
Ugursandi was born in about 1992 and she is from the Adivasi tribal background in Saraikela, Jharkhand. She saved her first salary as she was determined to buy a bike for her adventure aspirations, and she pursued her passion for motorcycling despite strong opposition from her family.

== Career ==
Ugursandi began her road adventure in 2019 using the bike she bought using her first salary savings. She accomplished numerous solo motorcycle trips across North Indian locations. In June 2021, with the assistance and guidance of the Border Roads Organisation (BRO), she made ambitious efforts to pursue a solo motorcycle expedition to Umling La, in Ladakh, situated at 19,300 feet. During her journey from Delhi to Umling La, she covered a record distance of 3,187 km in 25 days, while also crossing 18 mountain passes across the Himalayan range. Umling La was credited as the "highest altitude road" anywhere in 2021. She eventually became the first solo female biker to scale the Umling La.

In November 2024, Ugursandi successfully reached Lipulekh Pass by riding her bike all the way to the destination by starting her journey from Delhi, navigating through Pithoragarh in Uttarakhand. It was her third attempt when she scaled Lipulekh Pass. Kanchan also went on to become the first motorcyclist to scale the Lipulekh Pass in the India-China bordering region, at an elevation of 17,500 feet. She managed the challenge of reaching Lipulekh Pass by acclimatising to the poor conditions of the Kailash Mansarovar road.

Ugursandi made an appeal to Prime Minister Narendra Modi, pleading him to consider about implementing an action task force to form a corridor to Kailash Mansarovar, as she drew an example of the Kartarpur Sahib Corridor in Pakistan. In India Today, she revealed that she had made two previous unsuccessful attempts to reach Lipulekh Pass. She had to back out from those expeditions due to landslides near Dharchula.
