= Project Shivalik =

Military roads engineering project

Shivalik
- Founded: 25 February 2009; 17 years ago
- Country: India
- Type: Army, Engineering
- Role: Construction and maintenance of infrastructure in Uttarakhand, focusing in connectivity to Char Dham and the Bharatmala project.
- Headquarters: Rishikesh, Uttarakhand, India
- Motto: Shramena Sarvam Sadhyam
- Anniversaries: BRO Day: 7 May; Raising Day: 25 February
- Website: https://bro.gov.in

Commanders
- Director General: Lieutenant general Raghu Srinivasan
- Chief Engineer: Colonel Puneet Jain (2021)

Shivalik, also known as Project SHIVALIK, is a project of the Border Roads Organisation under the Ministry of Defence of India. It was established on 25 February 2009 to expedite the road infrastructure developmental works in Uttarakhand. The project mainly focuses in maintaining India–China border roads in the region while also providing year long connectivity to Char Dham. It also plays a vital role in the Bharatmala project in the region. Apart from these, the project also contributes in humanitarian assistance and disaster relief along with other agencies.

== Command structure ==
The project is mainly divided into 21st task force and the 36th task force. Both of these task forces include numerous companies which in turn include platoons and detachments. The task forces are headed by a commander while the companies are headed by an officer commanding.

== Works and involvements ==
Shivalik maintains more than 1,000 kilometres (620 mi) of roads and bridge infrastructure all around the mountainous terrain of Uttarakhand which include national highways and general staff roads which are in line with defence requirements. The project works in two sectors, Joshimath and Harsil. The project also maintains vital infrastructure in the remote areas of Sumna, Rimkhim and Lapthal near the line of actual control between India and China.

In early 2012, when the project was under Ministry of Road Transport and Highways, it faced lack of funding and work orders which caused a tussle between the project and the ministry. Later in 2015, the entirety of Border Roads Organisation was brought under the Ministry of Defence.

During the 2012 Himalayan flash floods, due to a cloud burst in the Uttarkashi district of Uttarakhand, a national highway suffered extensive damage which cut lines of communication in the Dharasu-Gangotri route. The project constructed two bailey bridges and repaired the roads restoring connectivity. In another instance in the same year, the project facilitated the restoration of the blockage of several major roads due to a cloud burst in Ukhimath of Rudraprayag district.

During the 2021 Uttarakhand flood, 13 villages in Chamoli district of Uttarakhand were cut off due to flash floods. Major damages occurred in Raini village where a glacial lake outburst flood in the Rishiganga river had washed away a 90 metres (0.056 mi) bridge which was the only connection to Niti valley. The flash floods also washed away a hydroelectric plant in the area which trapped more than 200 workers. The project deployed engineers and troops who constructed a 200 metres (0.12 mi) long bailey bridge restoring connectivity in record time. The project also took assistance from the Indian Air Force. The bridge was named The Bridge of Compassion to pay tribute to the workers who lost their lives in the hydroelectric plant.

Apart from these, the project also organises social welfare campaigns for the locals residing in the region. In 2022, the project organised marathons, car expeditions, health camps, sanitation and cleanliness drives, blood donation camps and social awareness programs related to road safety.

In May 2023, the project was lauded by the Minister of State for Defence Ajay Bhatt for its remarkable achievements in building road infrastructure and facilitating tourism.

In November 2023, the project assisted in the Uttarakhand tunnel rescue by facilitating the transportation of heavy machinery and providing coordination between different agencies. The project constructed a 1.15 kilometres (0.71 mi) road in record time to the drilling site along with 50 box culverts and 50m of concrete pipes.

In January 2024, defence minister Rajnath Singh inaugurated the 93 metres (305 ft) long Dhak bridge on the Joshimath - Malari Road among 34 other projects across the country. The bridge improved connectivity to the Niti valley.

== See also ==
- Project Dantak
- Project Vartak
