= Border Roads Organisation =

Indian statutory body

- सीमा सड़क संगठन
- Logo of Border Road Organisation

- Flag of BRO
- Abbreviation: BRO
- Formation: 7 May 1960
- Purpose: Providing infrastructure to the armed forces of India and friendly nations
- Headquarters: New Delhi
- Director General: Lt Gen Harpal Singh, AVSM, VSM
- Parent organisation: Ministry of Defence
- Budget: ₹7,146.5 crore (equivalent to ₹74 billion or US$790 million in 2026) (2025–26)
- Awards: 23 × Kirti Chakra; 218 × Shaurya Chakra; 2 × Padma Shri; 16 × Param Vishisht Seva Medal; 43 × Ati Vishisht Seva Medal; 25 × Sena Medal; 3 × Sarvottam Jeevan Raksha Padak; 17 × Uttam Jeevan Raksha Padak (see #Decorations for more details)
- Website: bro.gov.in

The Border Roads Organisation (BRO) is a statutory body under the ownership of the Ministry of Defence of the Government of India. BRO develops and maintains road networks in India's border areas and friendly neighboring countries. This includes infrastructure operations in 19 states and three union territories (including Andaman and Nicobar Islands) and neighboring countries such as Afghanistan, Bhutan, Myanmar, Tajikistan, and Sri Lanka. By 2022, BRO had constructed over 55,000 kilometres (34,000 mi) of roads, over 450 permanent bridges with a total length of over 44,000 metres (27 mi), and 19 airfields in strategic locations. BRO is also tasked with maintaining this infrastructure, including operations such as snow clearance.

Officers from the Border Roads Engineering Service (BRES) and personnel from the General Reserve Engineer Force (GREF) form the parent cadre of the BRO. It is also staffed by officers and troops drawn from the Indian Army Corps of Engineers on extra regimental employment (on deputation). The Indian Army Pioneer Corps is attached to the BRO task forces. BRO is also included in the Order of Battle of the Armed Forces, ensuring their support at any time. The organisations motto is Shramena Sarvam Sadhyam (everything is achievable through hardwork).

BRO is instrumental in significantly upgrading and building new India-China Border Roads (ICBRs). BRO set a Guinness World Record in November 2021 for the "highest altitude road" at Umling La, Ladakh. BRO has been instrumental in constructing projects like Atal Tunnel, Atal Setu, and Col Chewang Rinchen Setu, to name a few.

== History ==
The BRO was formed on 7 May 1960 to secure India's borders and develop infrastructure in remote areas of the north and north-east states of the country. To ensure coordination and expeditious execution of projects, the Government of India set up the Border Roads Development Board (BRDB) with the prime minister as chairman of the board and with the defence minister as deputy chairman.

Today, the BRDB exercises the financial and other powers of a Department of the Government of India and is chaired by the Minister of State for Defence. Among others, Chief(s) of Army and Air Staff, Engineer-in-Chief, Director General Border Roads (DGBR), and FA(DS) are members of the BRDB. The secretary of the board exercises the powers of Joint Secretary to the Government of India. The executive head of the BRO is the Director General Border Roads (DGBR), who holds the rank of lieutenant general. In a bid to boost border connectivity, BRO has been entirely brought under the Ministry of Defence in 2015. Earlier, it received funds from the Ministry of Surface Transport under the Ministry of Road Transport and Highways.

== Organisation ==
The BRO consists of the Border Roads Wing under the Ministry of Defense and the General Reserve Engineer Force (GREF). Officers are selected through the IES Examination conducted by the UPSC. Officers are also deputed from the Indian Army Corps of Engineers, who are posted to GREF on ERE. The GREF includes civil engineers, mechanical engineers, administrative officers, and medical officers.

The Border Roads Engineering Service (BRES) officers are governed by the Central Civil Services (CCS/ CCA) Rules, 1965. They are also subjected to all provisions of the Army Act, 1950 and Army Rules, 1954, except for a few exceptions as given in SRO 329 and SRO 330, both 23 September 1960. GREF is an integral part of the Armed Forces within meaning of Article 33 of the Constitution of India and members of GREF are also members of the Armed Forces as declared by the Supreme Court in respect of R. Viswan vs Union of India 1983 and authorized for all benefits which apply to Armed Forces of India. The organisation's operations are spread across India, Bhutan, Myanmar, Tajikistan, and Afghanistan. The BRO includes 18 projects, which are divided into Task Forces, Road Construction Companies (RCCs), Bridge Construction Companies (BCCs), Drain Maintenance Companies (DMCs), and Platoons. The organisation also includes base workshops, store divisions, training and recruitment centers, and other staff.

An Internal Financial Advisor (IFA) supports the BRO, performing the roles of Chief Accounts Officer and Internal Auditor. This system was introduced on 23 March 1995 to introduce efficiency and improve resource utilisation. The IFA secured ISO 9001 certification in December 1999. The organisation employs laborers locally. No local labourer is deployed in BRO for more than 179 days at a stretch, thus keeping the nature of their employment casual.

=== Director General of Border Roads ===
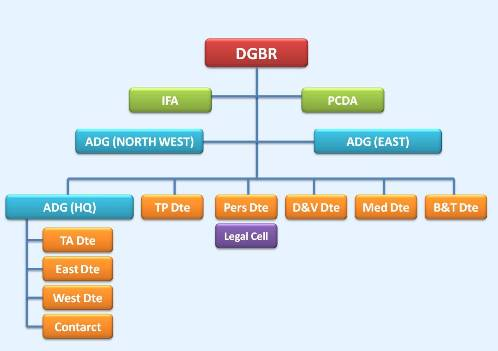
BRO Organization Chart

A list of the Director General of Border Road (DGBR):

List of DGBR
| # | Officeholders |
|---|---|
| 1 | Maj Gen KN Dubey, PVSM |
| 2 | Maj Gen RA Loomba |
| 3 | Maj Gen Arjan Singh |
| 4 | Maj Gen JS Bawa, AVSM |
| 5 | Brig Gobinder Singh (officiating) |
| 6 | Maj Gen VV Bhide, AVSM |
| 7 | Maj Gen JS Soin, PVSM |
| 8 | Maj Gen S Ahluwalia, AVSM |
| 9 | Maj Gen JM Rai, AVSM |
| 10 | Maj Gen JC Sachdeva, PVSM |
| 11 | Lt Gen MS Gosain, PVSM, AVSM, VSM |
| 12 | Lt Gen Maharaj Singh, PVSM, AVSM |
| 13 | Lt Gen Vimal Shinghal, PVSM, ADC |
| 14 | Lt Gen RJ Mordecai, PVSM, AVSM |
| 15 | Lt Gen AK Puri, PVSM, AVSM |
| 16 | Lt Gen Prakash Suri, PVSM |
| 17 | Lt Gen Ranjit Singh, SM |
| 18 | Lt Gen KS Rao, AVSM |
| 19 | Lt Gen AK Nanda, AVSM |
| 20 | Lt Gen MC Badhani, PVSM, VSM |
| 21 | Lt Gen S Ravi Shankar, PVSM, VSM |
| 22 | Lt Gen AT Parnaik, SM, VSM |
| 23 | Lt Gen RM Mittal, PVSM, AVSM, SM, VSM |
| 24 | Lt Gen Suresh Sharma, AVSM |
| 25 | Lt Gen SK Shrivastava, AVSM |
| 26 | Lt Gen Harpal Singh, PVSM, AVSM, VSM |
| 27 | Lt Gen Rajeev Chaudhry, VSM |
| 28 | Lt Gen Raghu Srinivasan, VSM |
| 29 | Lt Gen Harpal Singh, AVSM, VSM (incumbent) |

=== Centres of excellence ===
In June 2021, the "Centre of Excellence for Road Safety & Awareness" and "Centre of Excellence for Roads, Bridges, Air Fields and Tunnels" were set up.

=== Ranks ===
Officers

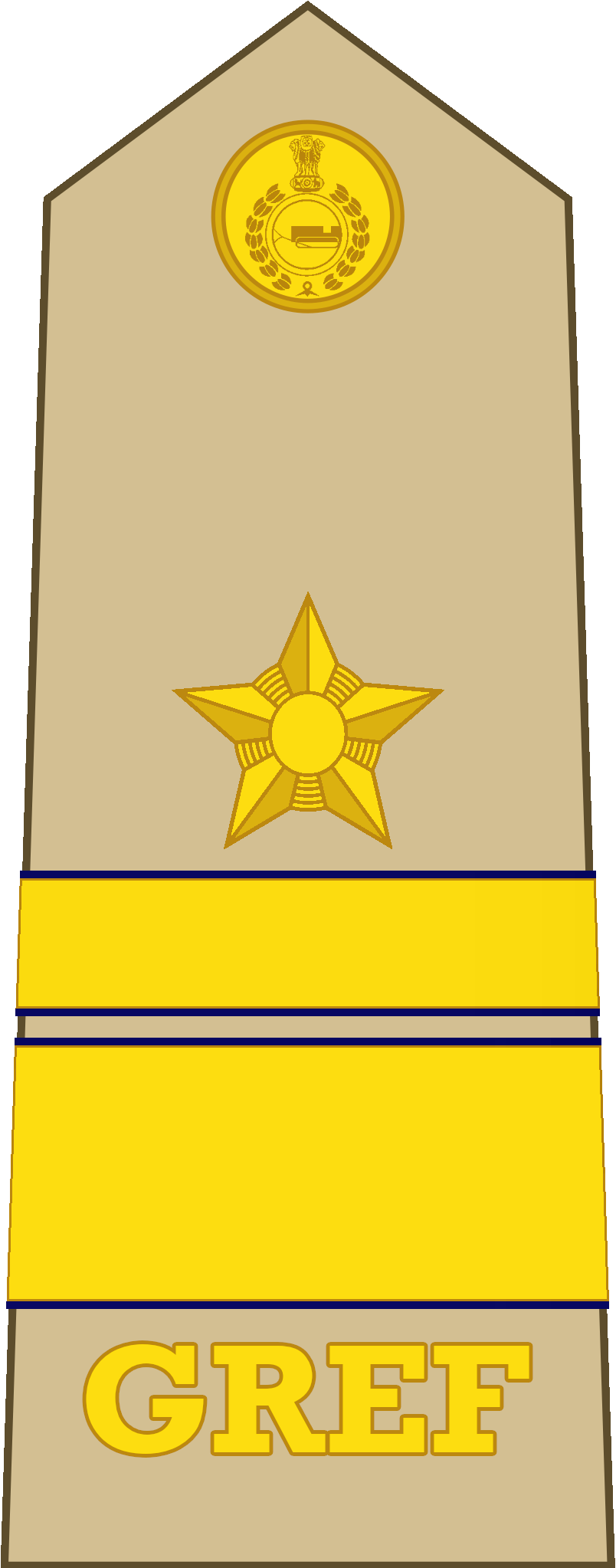
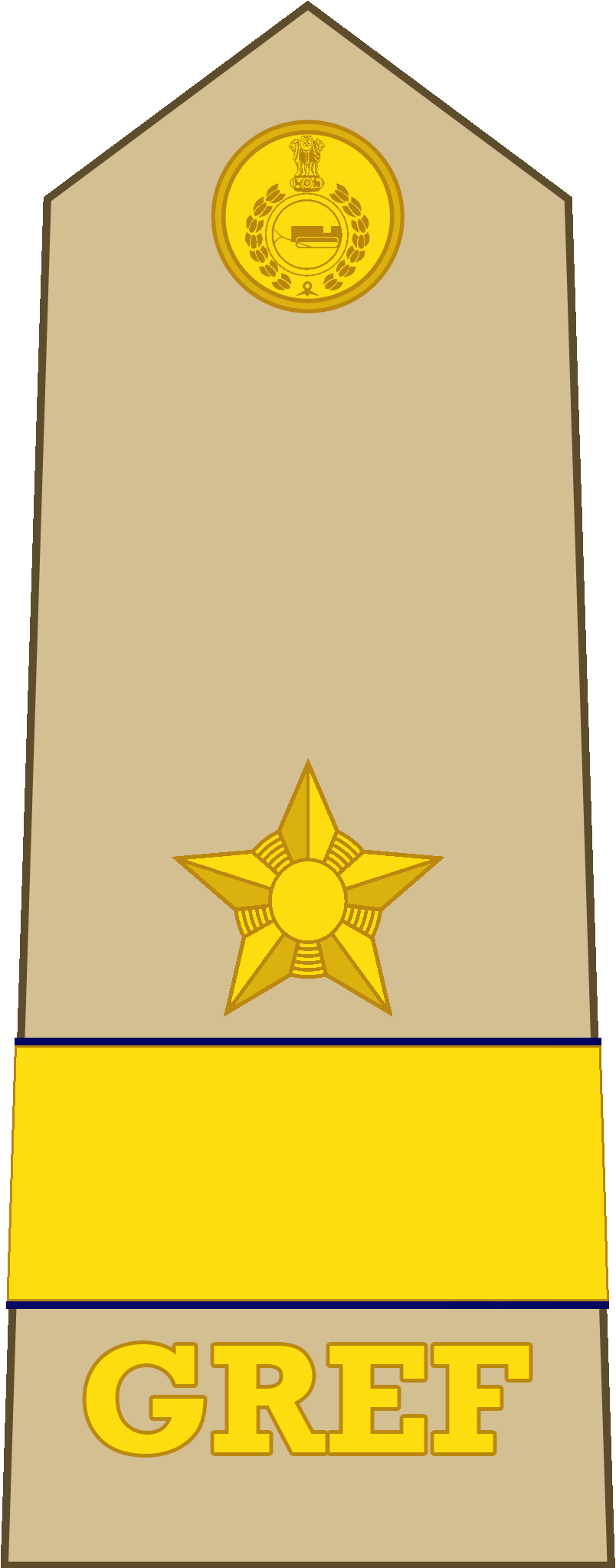
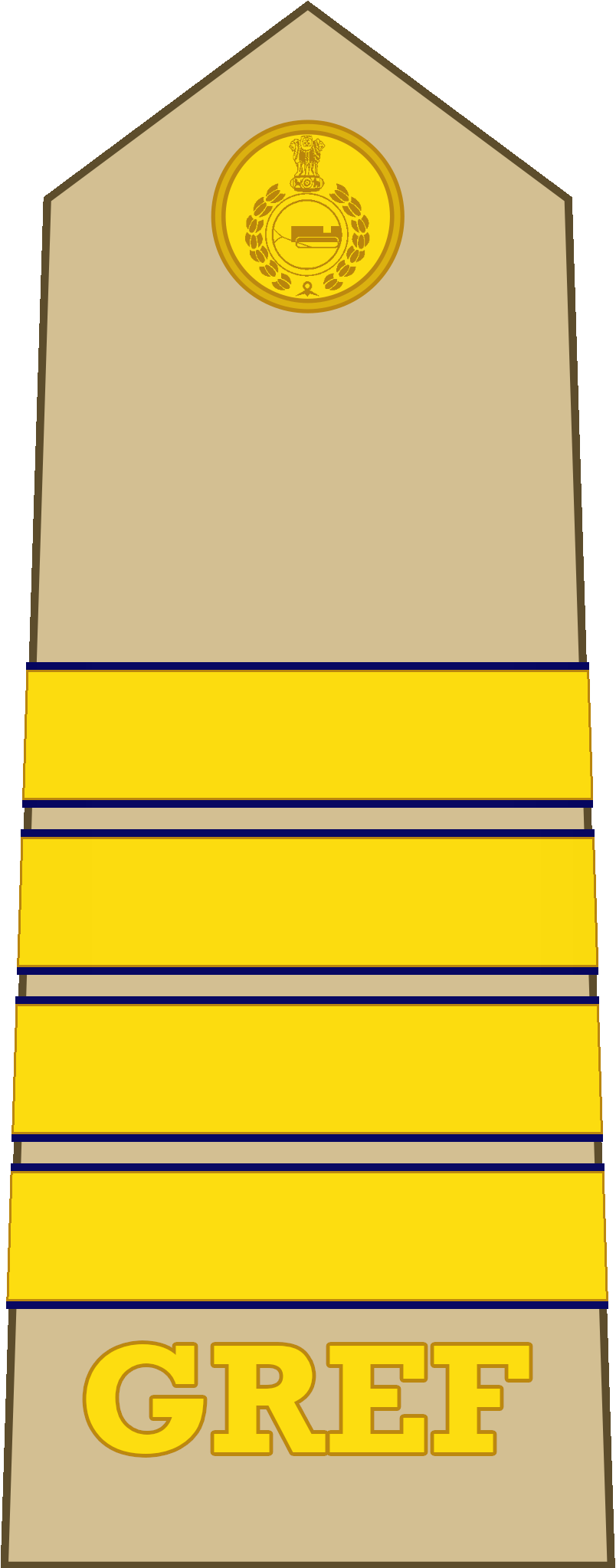
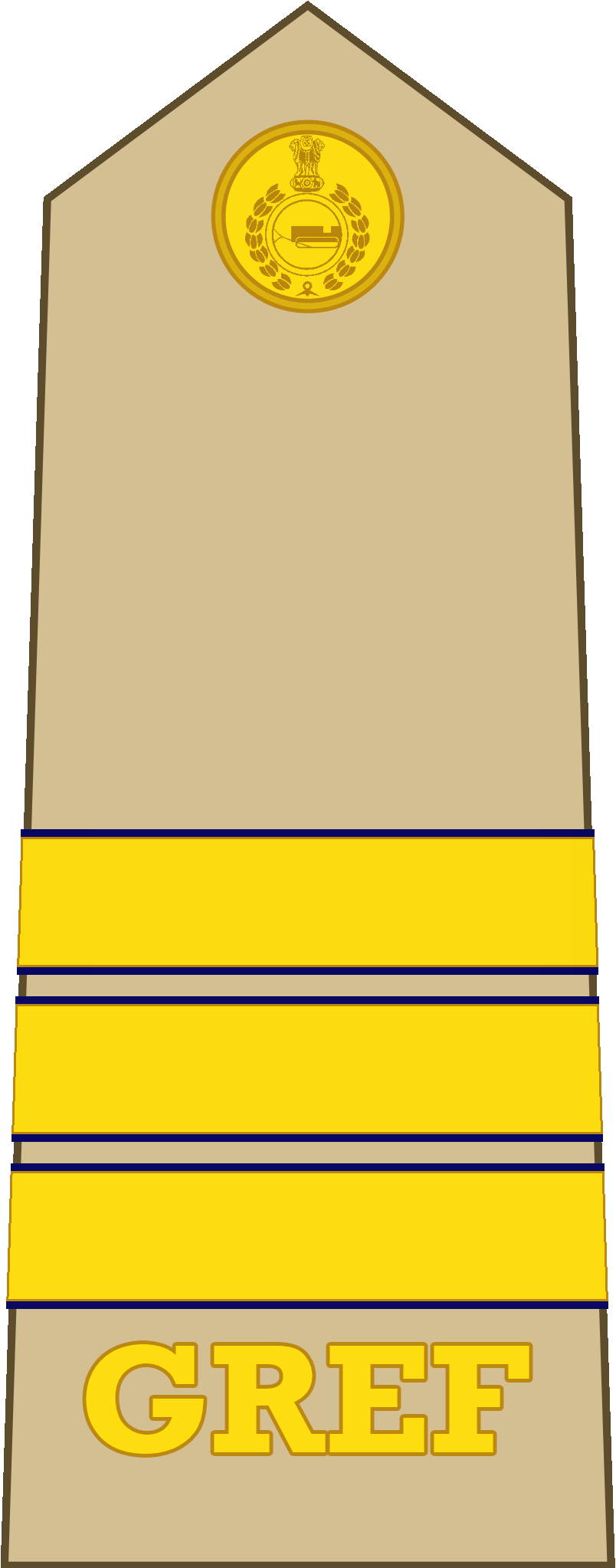
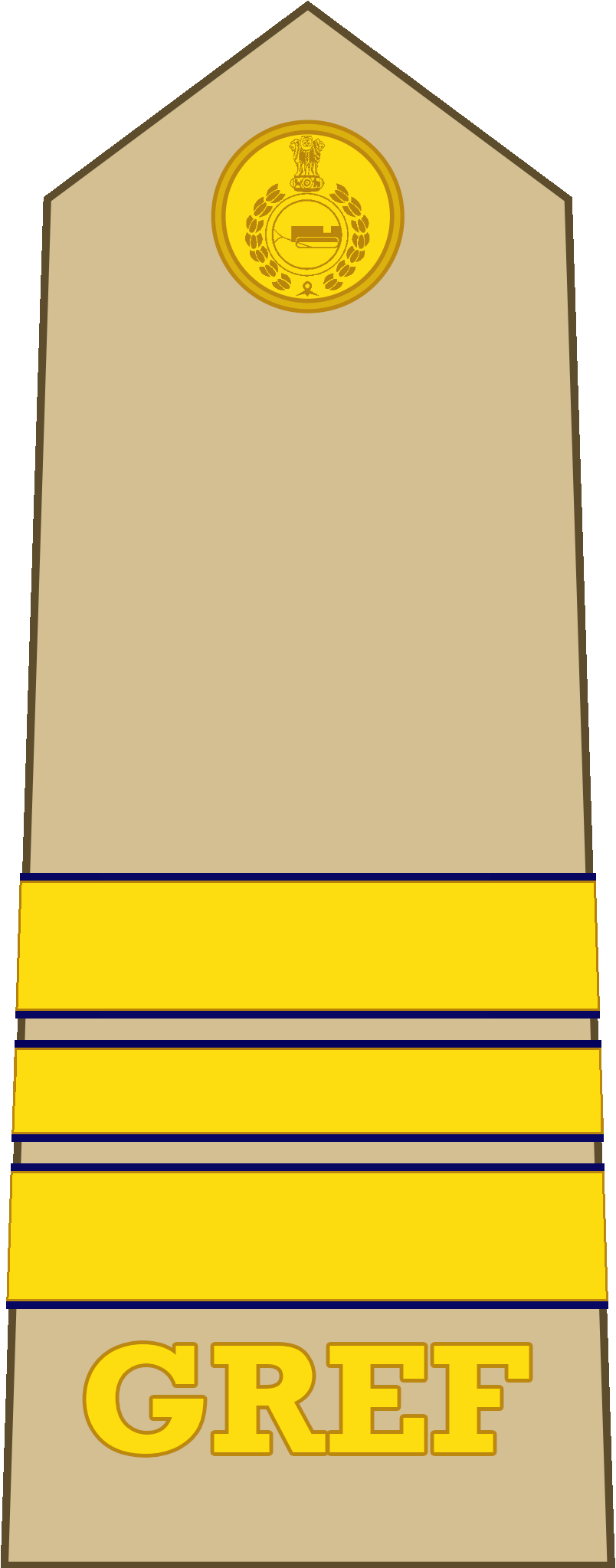
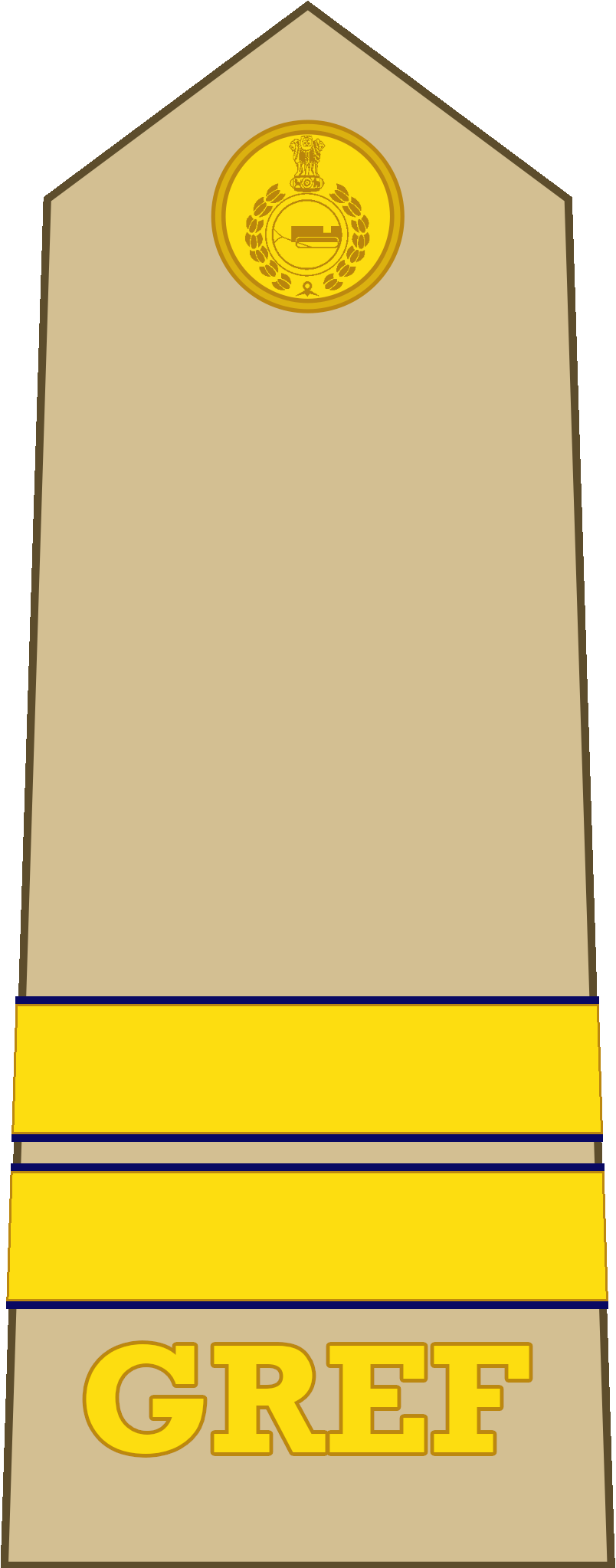
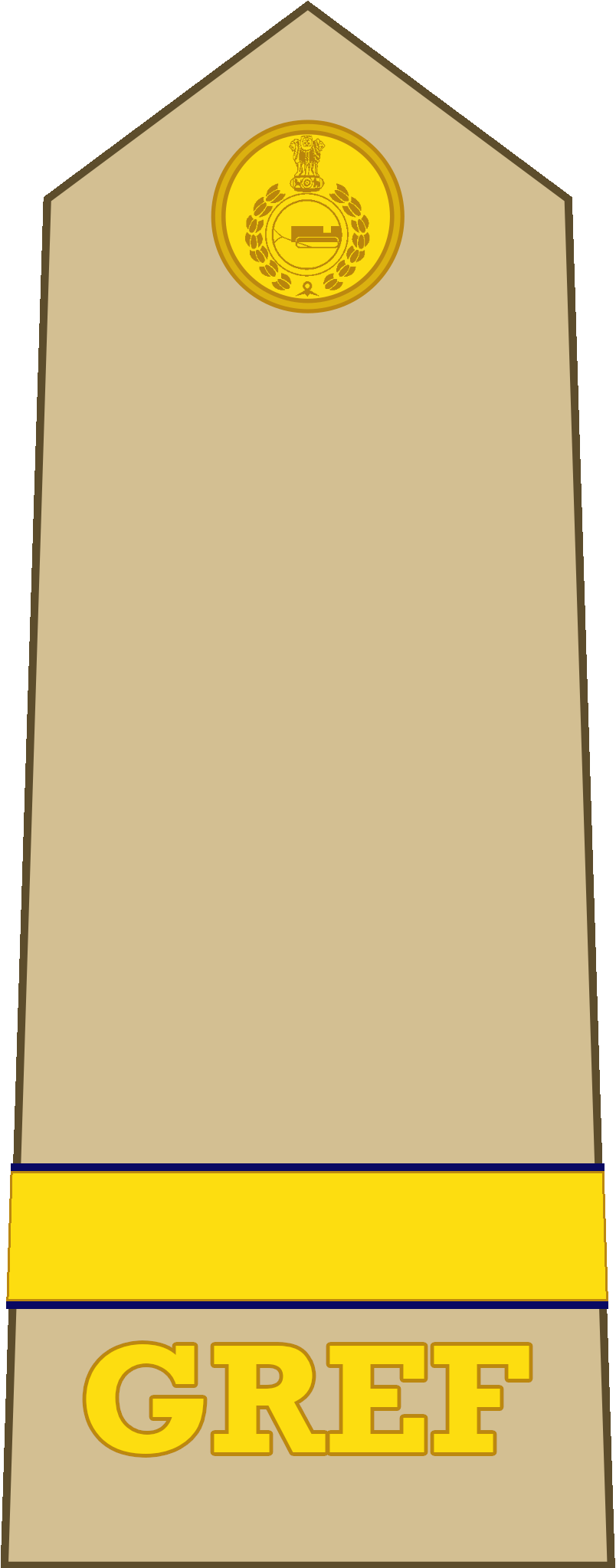
| Rank group | General / flag officers | | | Senior officers | | Junior officers |
|---|---|---|---|---|---|---|---|
| Indian Border; Roads Organisation |
| Indian Border; Roads Organisation | Director general महानिदेशक जनरल | Additional director general अतिरिक्त महानिदेशक जनरल | Chief engineer मुख्य अभियन्ता | Superintending engineer अधीक्षण अभियंता | Executive engineer कार्यकारी अभियंता | Assistant executive engineer सहायक कार्यकारी अभियंता | Assistant engineer सहायक अभियंता |

Other ranks

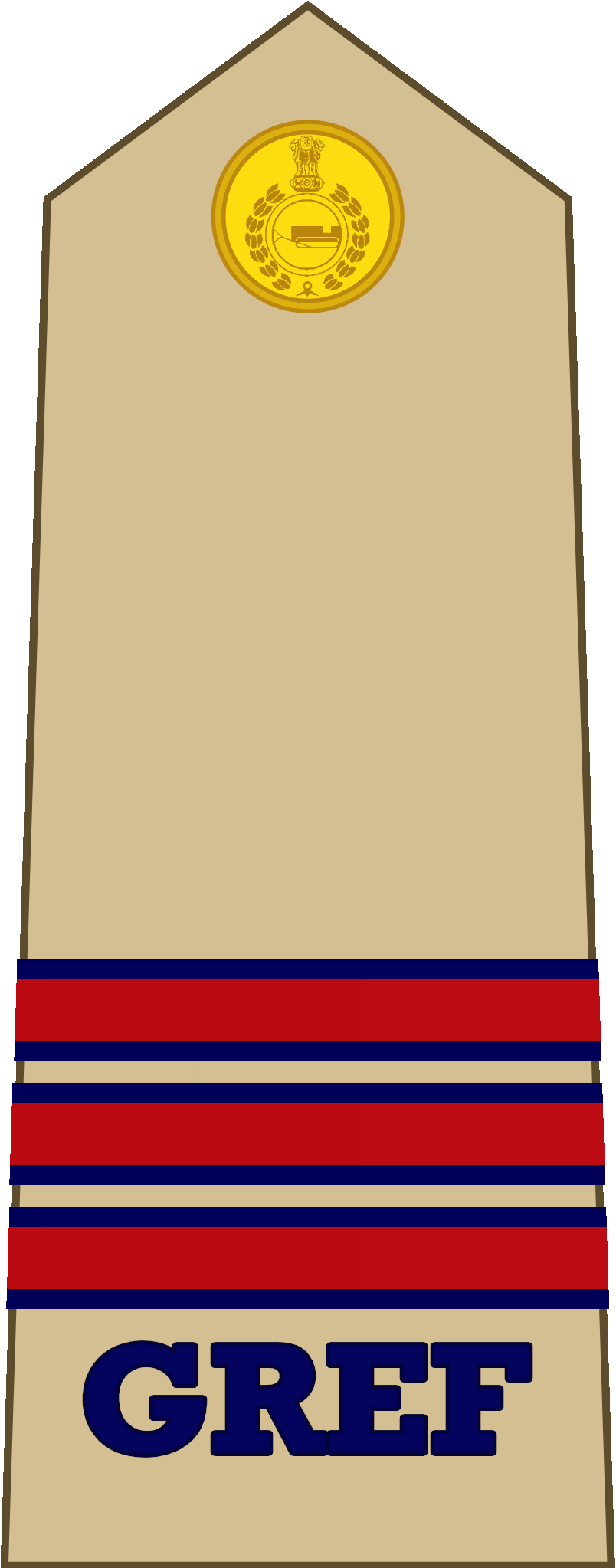
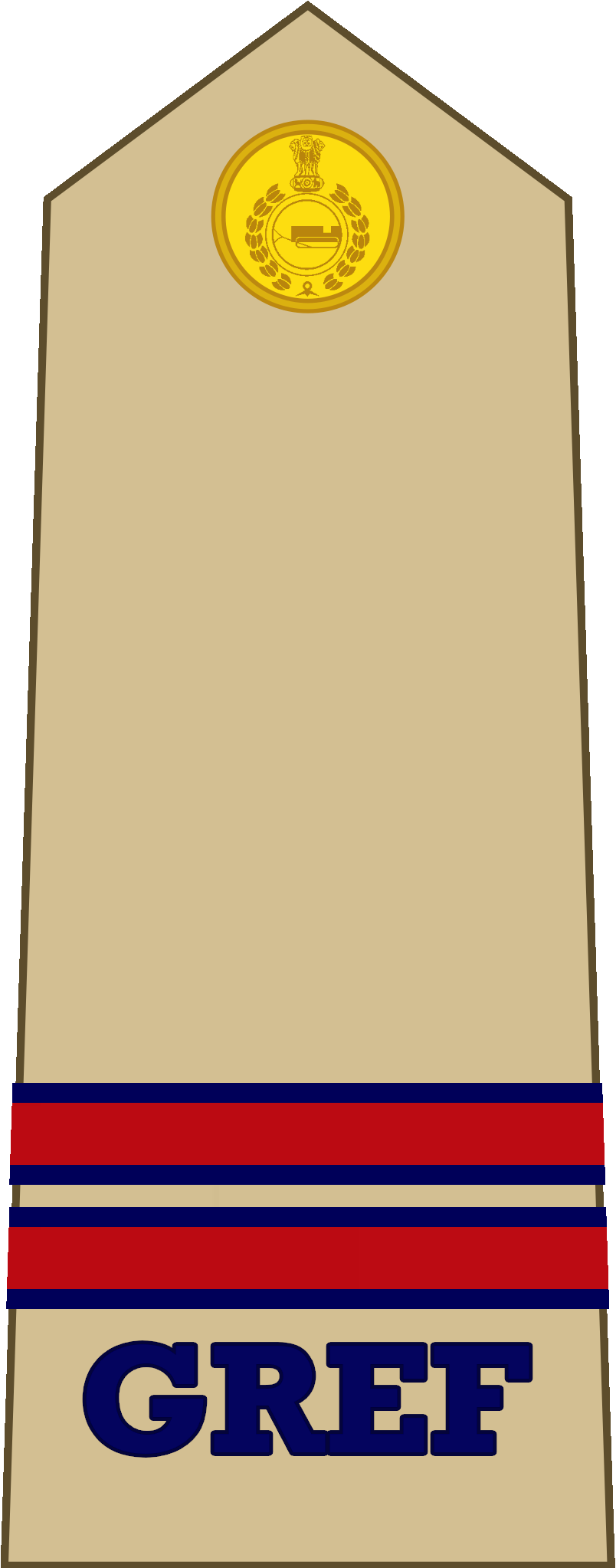
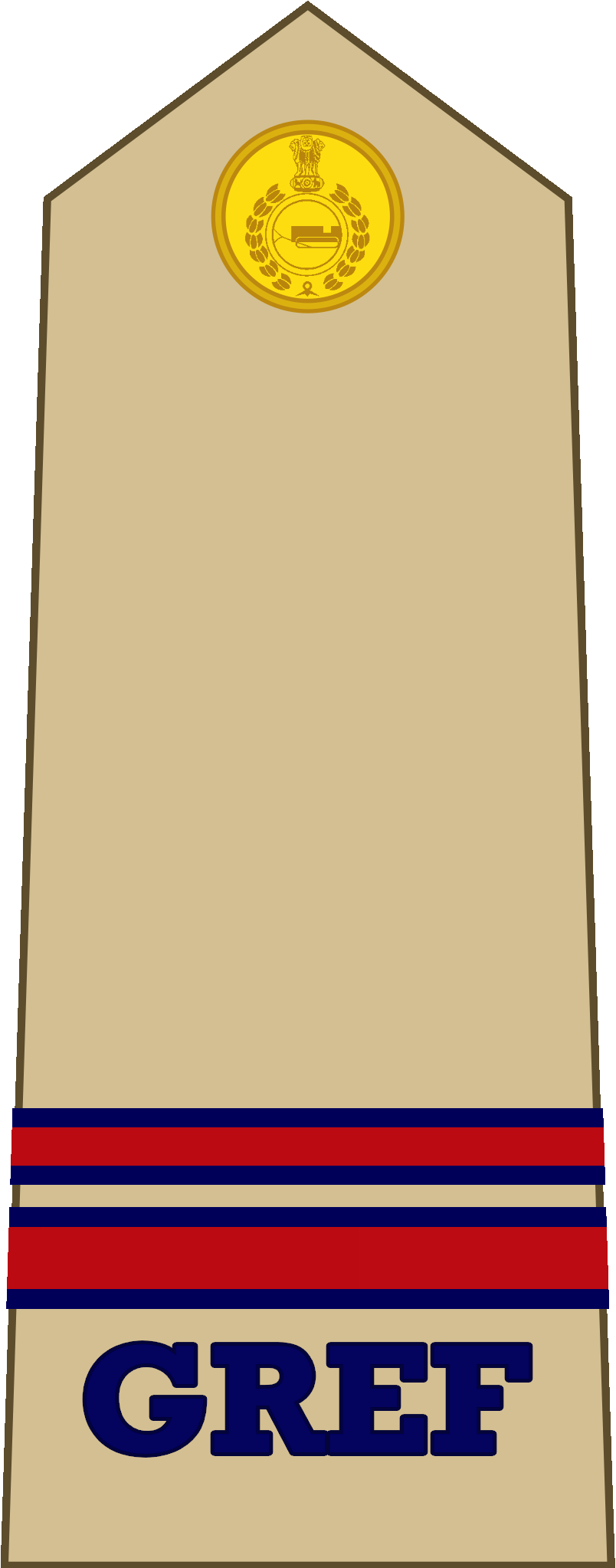
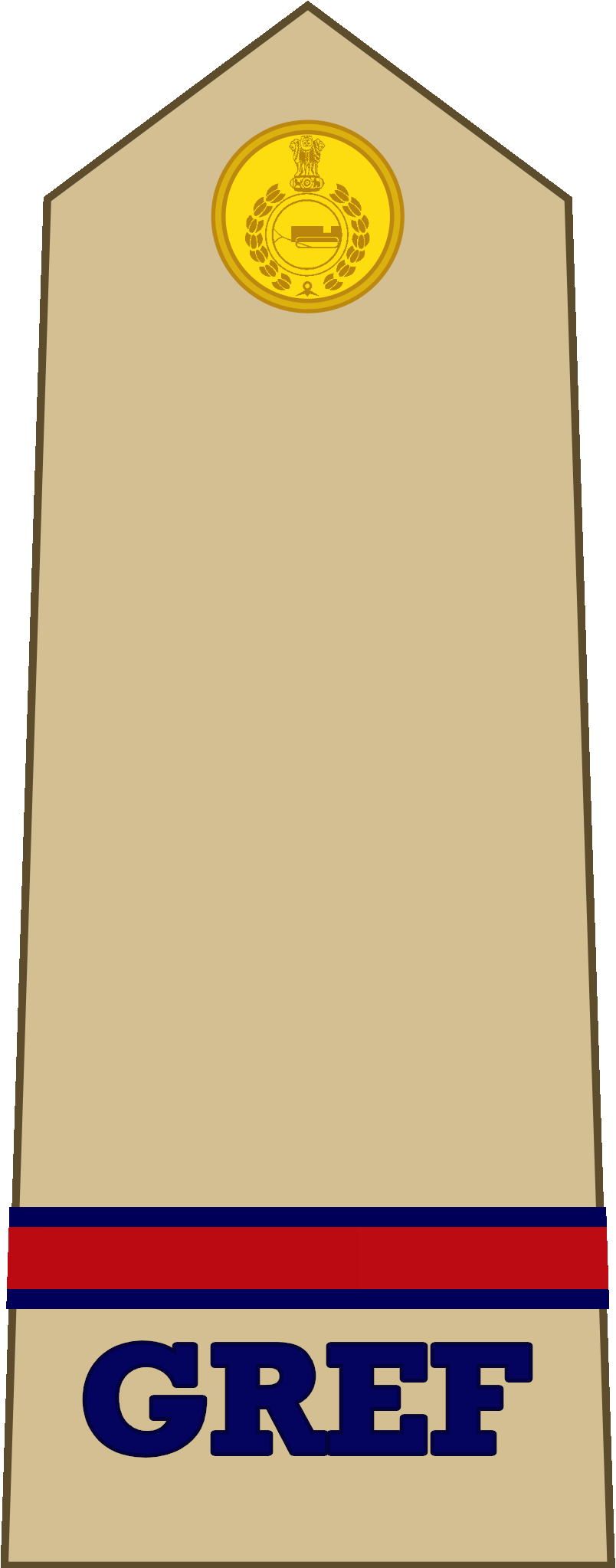
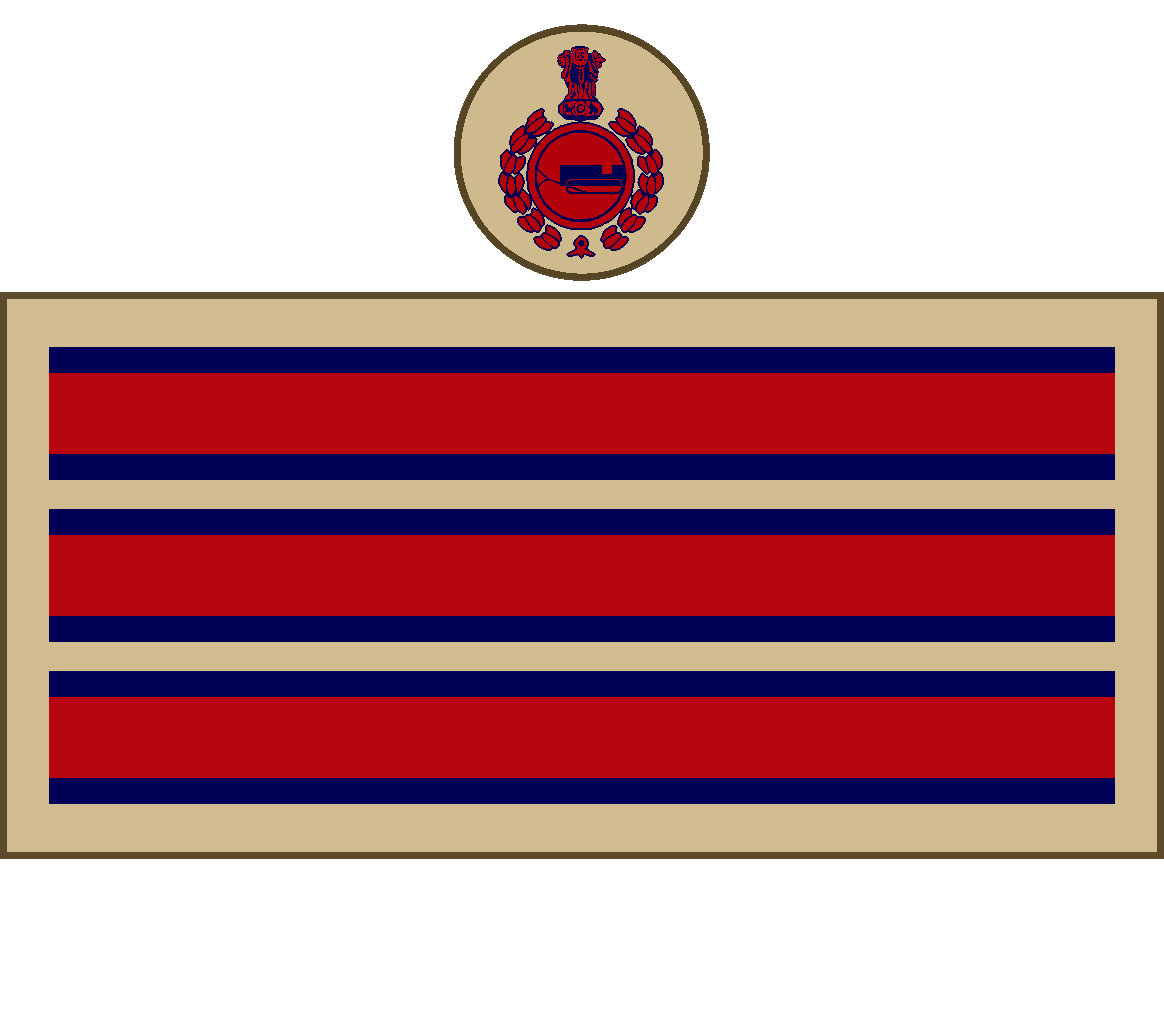
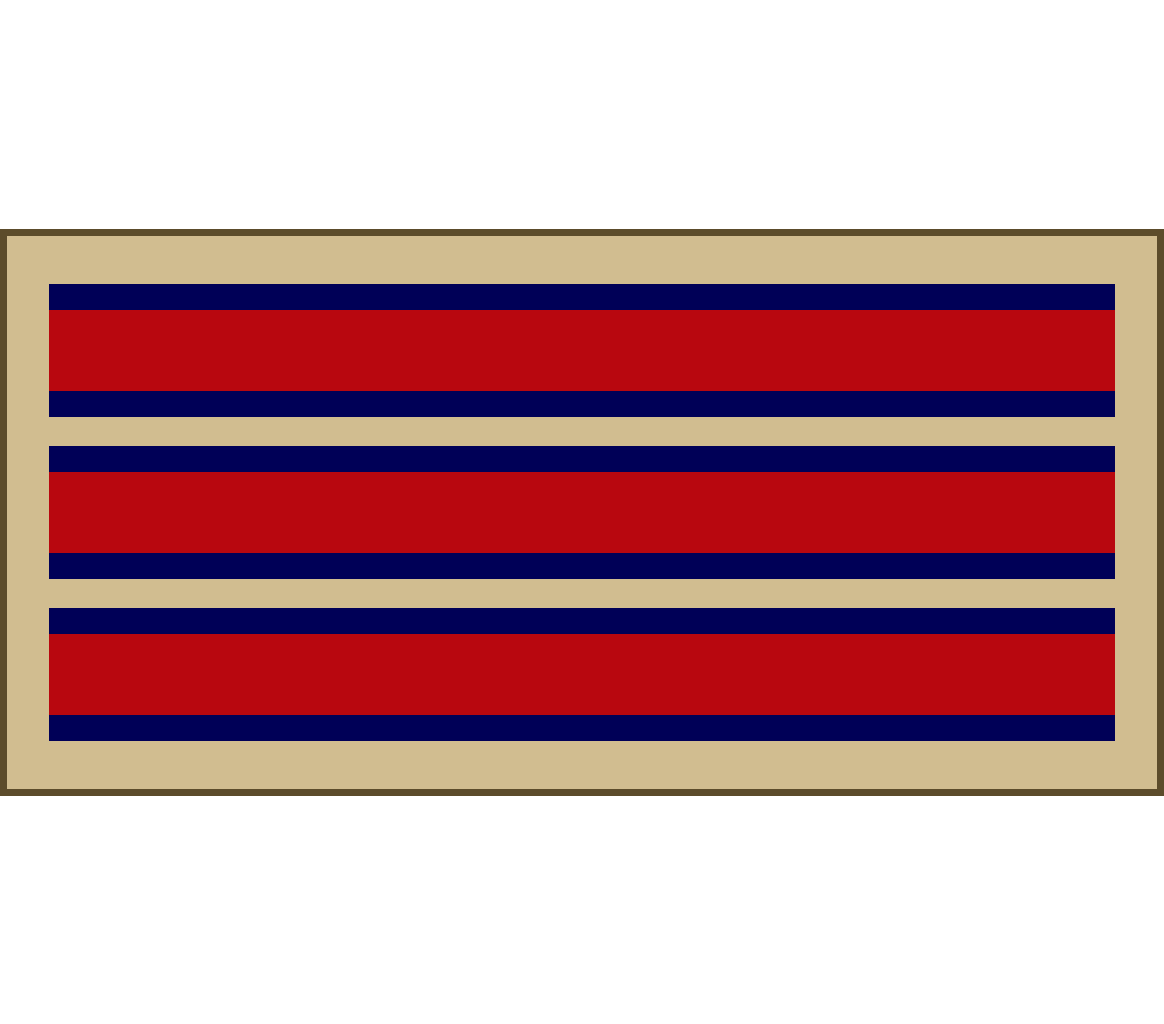
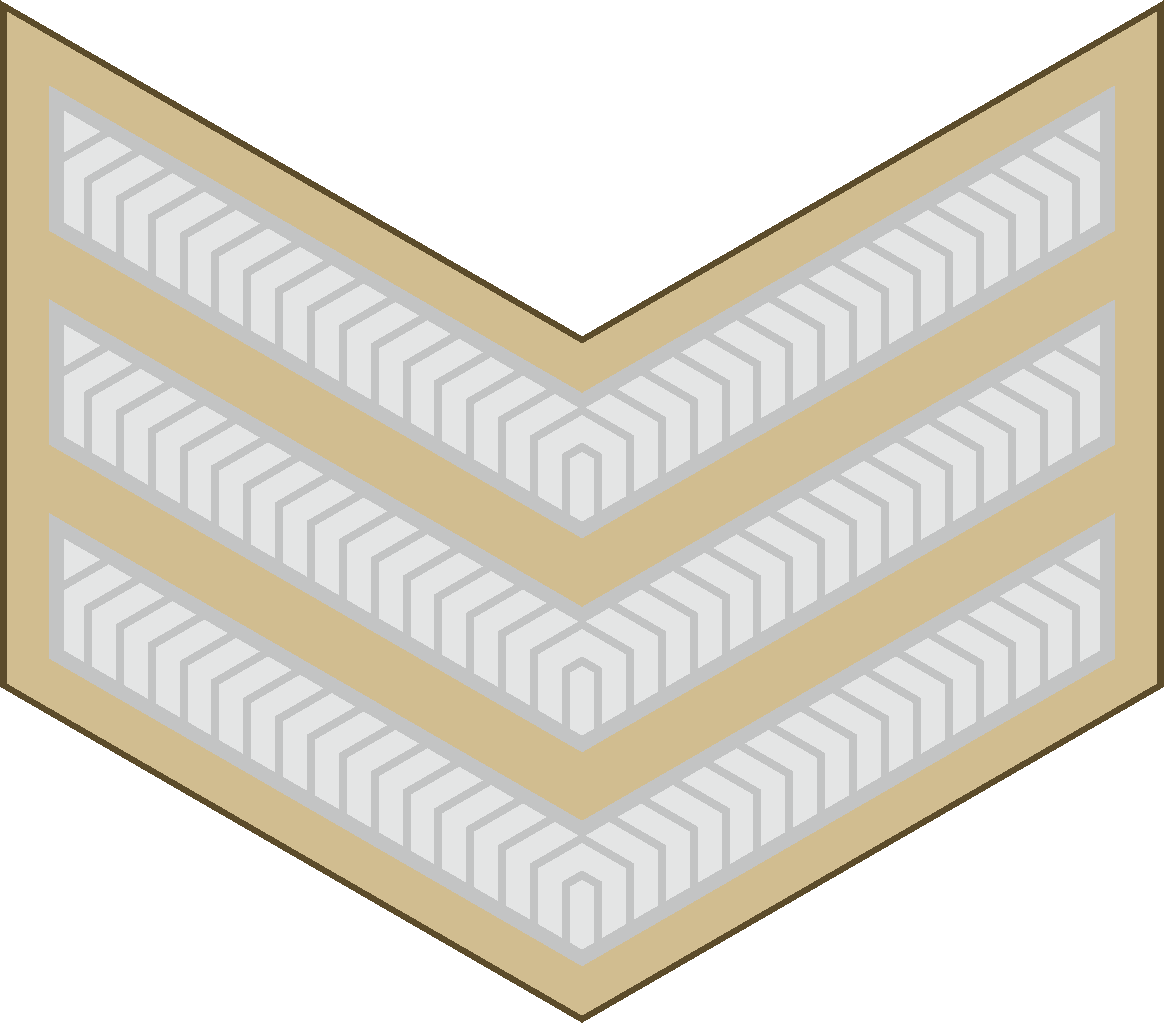
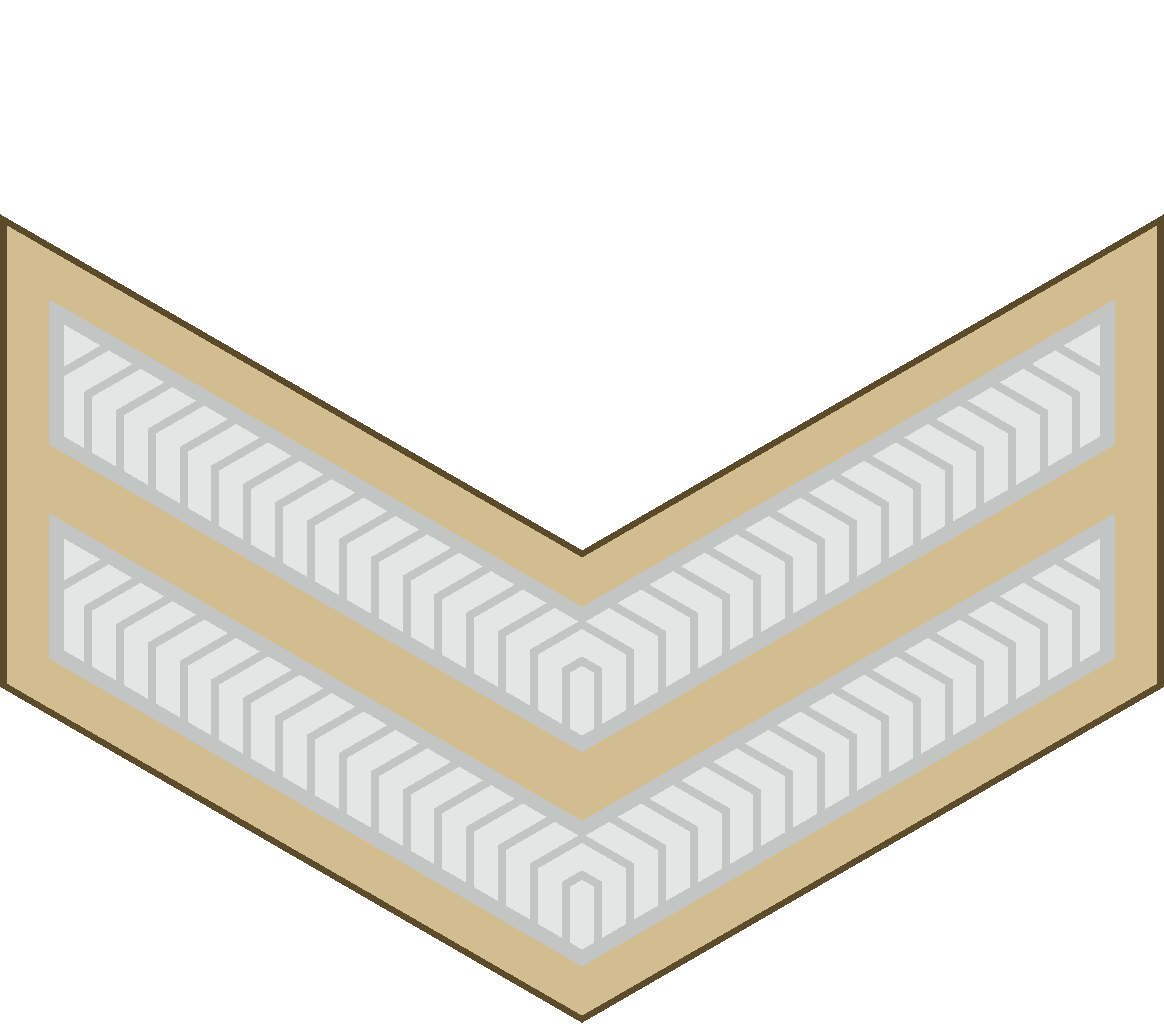
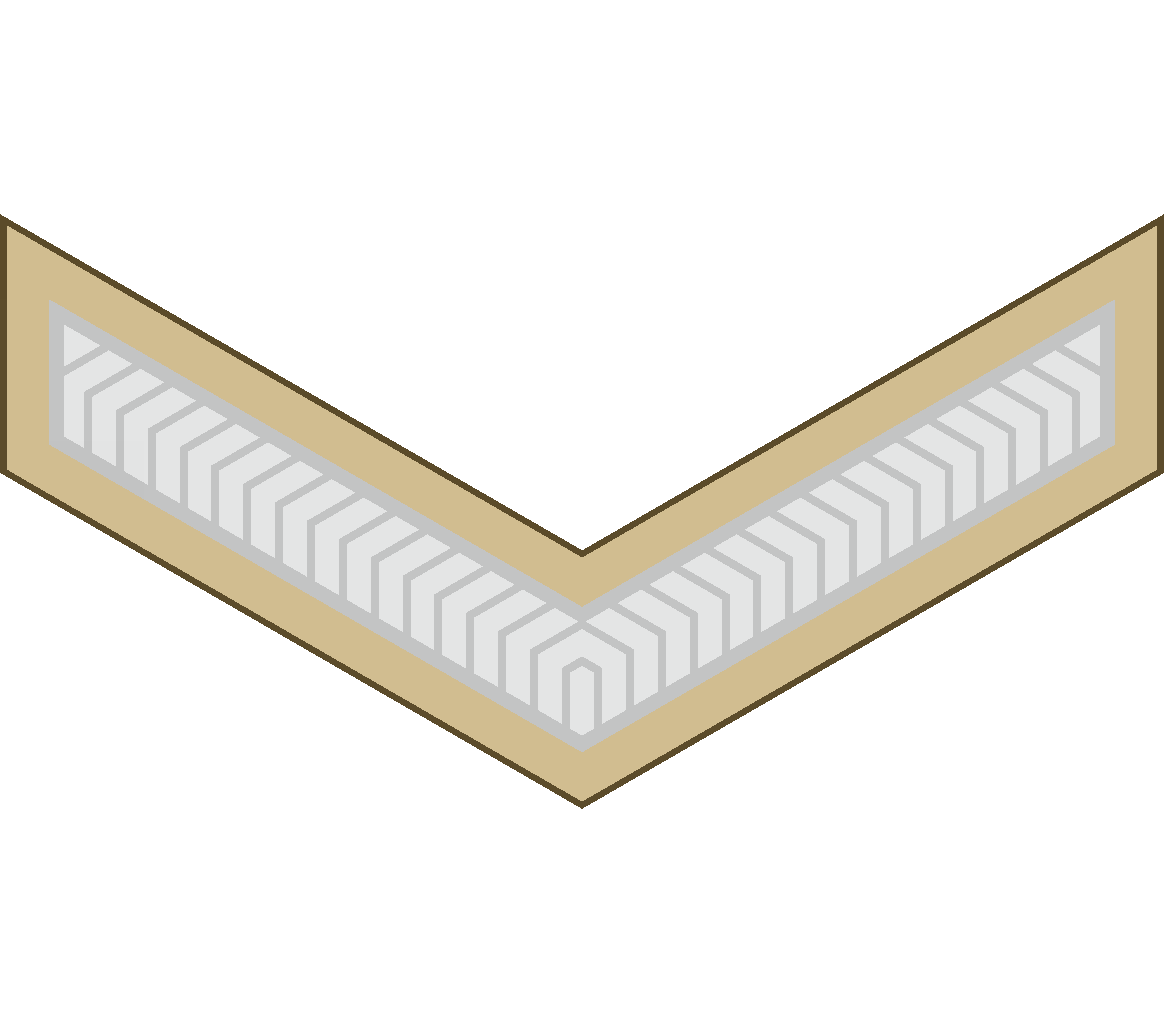
| Rank group | Subordinate Officers (SO) | | | | Non commissioned officers (NCO) | | | | | Enlisted |
|---|---|---|---|---|---|---|---|---|---|---|
| Indian Border; Roads Organisation | | | | | | | | | | No insignia |
| Indian Border; Roads Organisation | Senior translation officer | Junior engineer/ Senior supervisor/ Superintendent/ Translation officer | Assistant superintendent | Supervisor | Radio mechanic | Leading hand | Special grade | Grade-I | Grade-II | Pioneer |

== Role of the BRO ==
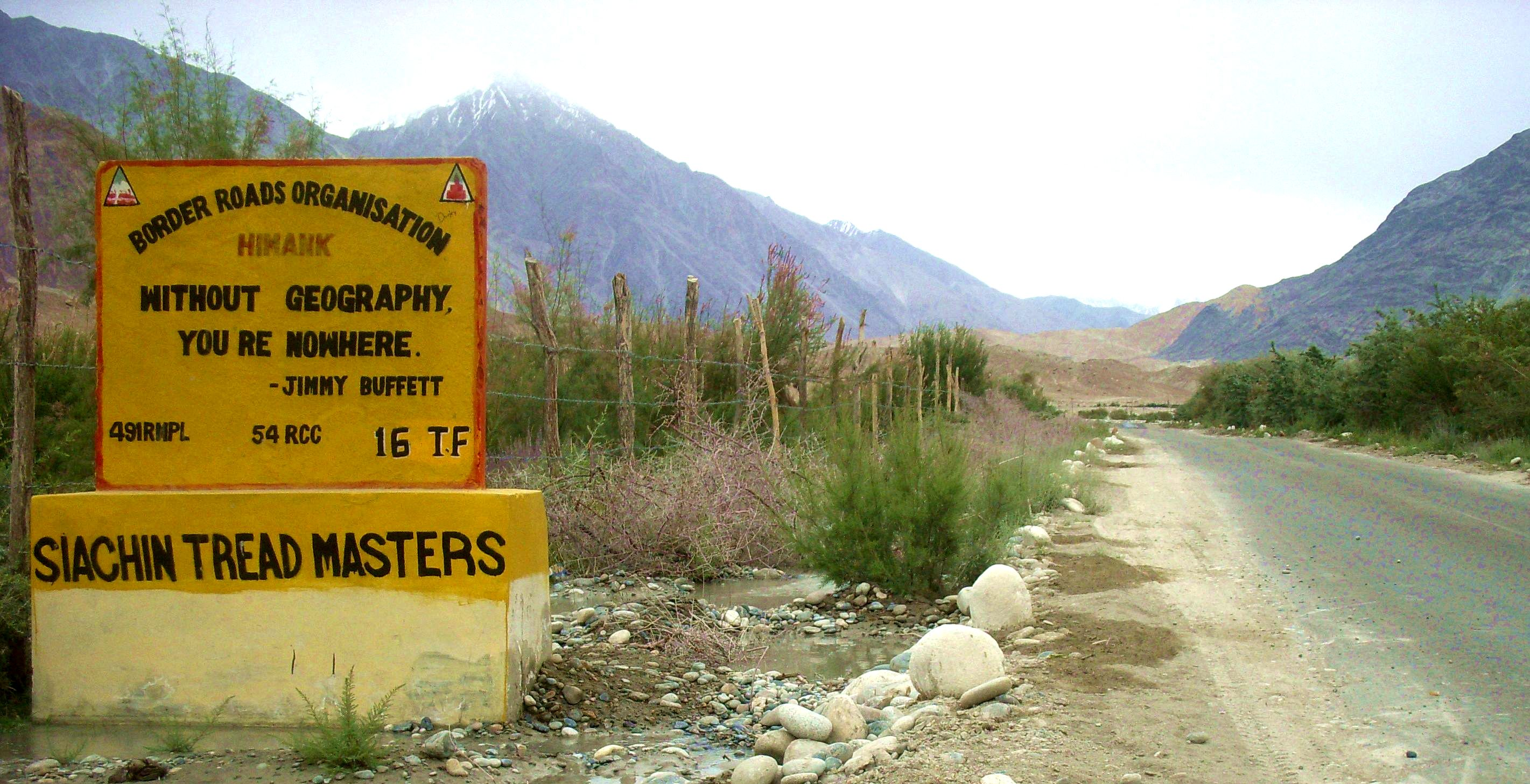
A Himank BRO road sign in Ladakh

BRO is entrusted with the construction of roads, bridges, tunnels, causeways, helipads, and airfields. The BRO is also in charge of the maintenance of its road networks. In many places, landslides, avalanches, and snow block the routes and have to be cleared as quickly as possible. BRO also employs more than 200,000 casual paid labourers for the task.

=== During Peace ===
1. To develop and maintain the operational road infrastructure of General Staff (GS) roads in the border areas.
2. To contribute to the socio-economic development of the border states.

=== During War ===
1. To develop and maintain roads to keep the line of control through in original sectors and re-deployed sectors.
2. To execute additional tasks as laid down by the government contributing to the war effort.

=== Research and development collaboration ===
BRO collaborates with Council of Scientific and Industrial Research (CSIR) to bring the private sector innovations to border areas with the military's mission-oriented precision and discipline. This includes the use of the rejupe mix which allows bitumen to work at lower temperatures, use of high quality interlocking paver blocks in the durable roads at icy alpine heights, geotagging waypoints allowing snow-clearing machinery to stay accurately on the road while road is covered with snow with steep cliff-face gorges, etc.

== Border infrastructure development ==
In response to the ever-present security threat from Pakistan and increased incursions and rapid border infrastructure from China, India, too, is undertaking border infrastructure development.

=== Project names by geography ===
The BRO undertakes projects in India and friendly countries. These projects typically include developing roads, bridges, and airfields in hostile environments shunned by private enterprises, whether due to security concerns related to hostilities or because of environmental challenges. BRO has been active during the 1962 war, the conflicts with Pakistan in 1965 and 1971, and has also been active in anti-insurgency operations in the northeast.

The BRO operates in 18 projects namely: Arunank, Beacon, Brahmank, Chetak, Deepak, Dantak (Bhutan), Himank, Hirak, Pushpak, Sampark, Yojak, Sewak, Shivalik, Swastik, Udayak, Vartak and Vijayak.

Project Vijayak, raised in 2010, Project Vijayak has developed over 1,400 km of roads and 80 bridges in Ladakh. On its 15th Raising Day in 2025, it announced ₹1,200 crore worth of new works, including tunnels, bridges, and advanced road technologies. The project is noted for reopening the Zojila Pass within 31 days in 2025, and reflects India's focus on connectivity and development in remote frontier

BRO projects in India and friendly nations
| | BRO Projects | HQ/ Location | Notes |
Jammu, Kashmir, Ladakh
| 1 | Beacon | Srinagar | Beacon is the oldest BRO project (along with Vartak). Initially known as Chief Engineer Roads (Ladakh) when it was initiated in 1960, it was renamed as Chief Engineer Project Beacon. Roads under Beacon include NH1A, NH1B, NH1D, Zoji La tunnel. |
| 2 | Himank | Leh | Beacon was divided into projects Sampark and Himank. |
| 3 | Sampark | Jammu | Beacon was divided into projects Sampark and Himank. |
| 4 | Vijayak | Leh | Raised in September 2010. |
| 5 | Nimmu-Padam-Darcha | Ladhak | strategically important all-weather 298 km long Nimmu-Padam-Darcha Road |
Sikkim, Northeast
| 6 | Vartak | Tezpur | One of two projects raised in May 1960 and focused on Arunachal Pradesh. Formerly designated Project Tusker. Undertakes China Study Group roads. |
| 5 | Udayak | Doom Dooma | One of the two older projects was raised in May 1960. Assigned road infrastructure projects in the north-east region of the country. |
| 7 | Arunanak | Papum Pare | Vartak was divided into Arunanak. Raised at Naharlagun. |
| 8 | Sewak | Dimapur | Road development in the north-east amidst insurgency; roads include the Zunheboto-Aghunato-Kiphire road. |
| 9 | Pushpak | Aizawl | Roads in north-east India including Mizoram, Assam and Manipur; NH-39, NH-53. |
| 10 | Setuk | Shillong | Raised in 1990 for bridge construction. Restructured in 1994 to assist in other road development projects in the north-east. The project has also been assigned fencing along the India-Bangladesh border. |
| 11 | Swastik | Gangtok | Revived in 2008. Roads in Sikkim. |
Other states
| 12 | Hirak | Tanakpur | Hirak (transl. Black Diamond) are responsible for the NH-16 and roads and bridges in the naxal areas. It has also undertaken work in the Andaman and Nicobar Islands. |
| 13 | Shivalik | Rishikesh | Road infrastructure to the international border. |
| 14 | Deepak | Shimla | Project Deepak continues to improve roads in Uttarakhand. It keeps open the roads to Char Dhams and Gurudwara Shri Hemkund Sahib. |
| 15 | Brahmank | Pasighat | |
| 16 | Chetak | Bikaner | Raised in 1962 and named after Maharana Pratap's horse Chetak. Roads and development undertaken include the Joshimath-Malari-Rinkin road, Rishikesh-Badrinath road, Tanankpur-Tawaghat road, NH4B, 17B, and naval airfield resurfacing in Maharashtra. |
| 17 | Yojak | Manali (temporary) | Inaugurated in 2022, it is tasked to construct tunnels and maintain existing tunnels like the Atal Tunnel, along with building roads in the Manali-Ladakh axis |
National-International
| 18 | Dantak | Simtokha | Initiated in Bhutan, Dantak now covers adjacent India states. Roads developed include Sherbathang-Nathu La road, Gangtok-Sherbathang road, and Sevoke-Gangtok road. |
Projects have also included those in Myanmar and Afghanistan (Zaranj).

=== Yearly summary of roads constructed ===
BRO road length constructed in India.
| Fiscal year | Length constructed | Annual budget (₹ crore) | Notes |
|---|---|---|---|
| Before 2015 | 50,000 kilometres (31,000 mi) | ~2,000 | 632 kilometres (393 mi)/year between 2010-15 |
| 2015–2016 | ? | 3,300 | 809 kilometres (503 mi)/year between 2015-20 |
| 2016–2017 | ? | 4,300 | 809 kilometres (503 mi)/year between 2015-20 |
| 2017–2018 | 612.82 kilometres (380.79 mi) | 4,500 | 809 kilometres (503 mi)/year between 2015-20 |
| 2018–2019 | 608.62 kilometres (378.18 mi) | 4,900 | 809 kilometres (503 mi)/year between 2015-20 |
| 2019–2020 | 991.22 kilometres (615.92 mi) | 5,200 | 809 kilometres (503 mi)/year between 2015-20 |
| 2020–2021 | 940.64 kilometres (584.49 mi) | 5,800 | 809 kilometres (503 mi)/year between 2020-20 |
| 2021–2022 | 741.70 kilometres (460.87 mi) | 6,500 | 3,595 km (2,234 mi) new BRO roads in five years from 2017–2018 to 2021–2022. |
| 2022–2023 | ? | 7,500 | |
| 2023–2024 | ? | 8,500 | |
| 2024–2025 | 1,125 kilometres (699 mi) | 9,500 | |
| 2025–2026 | 1,500 kilometres (930 mi) | 16,000 | |
| 2026–2027 | | 18,700 | |
| Total | ~55,000 kilometres (34,000 mi) | | |

=== Border roads ===
As per a July 2017 update to Lok Sabha from the Government of India, construction of 73 completed strategic roads along the Sino-India border was approved in 2005 with initial and currently revised deadlines of 2012–2013 and 2019–2020 respectively, including 43 by the Ministry of Defence and 27 by the Ministry of Home Affairs, of which only 21 roads by March 2017 and 30 roads by July 2017 have been completed and the remaining are under construction as progress was slowed down due to wildlife conservation and environmental approval, insurgency related security hurdles, delay in land acquisition by the states, inaccessible terrain, inclement weather, and other impediments.

BRO is constructing 63 out of these 73 roads as it costs BRO ₹15 million (equivalent to ₹23 million, US$250,000 or €220,000 in 2026) to ₹30 million (equivalent to ₹46 million, US$490,000 or €440,000 in 2026) per km compared to ₹60 million (equivalent to ₹92 million, US$980,000 or €870,000 in 2026) to ₹70 million (equivalent to ₹110 million, US$1.1 million or €1.0 million in 2026) per km of road construction by the private companies. In two years alone, 2015–16 and 2016–17, prime minister Narendra Modi's government has allocated more than US$4.7 billion in contracts for the development of border roads, which also includes the US$256 million 1,360 kilometres (850 mi) India–Myanmar–Thailand Trilateral Highway from Moreh in Manipur through Tamu, Myanmar to Mae Sot in Thailand.

In July 2020, BRO was also tasked with building new roads to connect eastern Bhutan to western Tawang area such as Lumla-Trashigang road through Sakteng Wildlife Sanctuary.

=== Road bridges ===
To provide multiple points of alternative connectivity to the forces, BRO is building 410 2-lane class-70 (heavy load bearing including tanks) road bridges along the 3,440 km (2,140 mi) long McMahon Line border with China, including 144 in Arunachal Pradesh (75 already under construction and will be completed by 2020), 100 under construction in Jammu and Kashmir, 55 under construction in Uttrakhand, 40 under construction in Sikkim and 25 under construction in Himachal Pradesh (c. Dec 2017). The annual pace of construction is 3 km (1.9 mi) of bridges (c. Dec 2017). On 12 October 2020, Defense Minister Rajnath Singh inaugurated 44 new bridges.

=== Border tunnels ===
In November 2017, BRO announced the plan to construct 17 road and rail tunnels, with a total length of 100 km (62 mi), on some of the 73 strategic roads on the Sino-Indian border to provide year-round all-weather rail and road surface connectivity. Currently, surface access to high altitude posts on the Sino-India border is closed for six months every year due to snowfall and rain, and supplies are through air lift only. Some of these 17 tunnels are already under construction, including Srinagar-Kargil-Leh NH1 in J&K (Zoji La pass tunnel), Leh-Manali Highway in J&K and Himachal Pradesh (Lungalacha La, Bara-lacha la, Tanglang La, Shingo La near Nimo and Rohtang Tunnel), 578 meter Theng Pass tunnel on NH310A between Chungthang and Tung in North Sikkim, Nechipu Pass (near Bomdila) and Sela Pass tunnels on Bogibeel Assam to Sagalee to Tawang NH13 in Arunachal Pradesh. This will reduce the travel time and operational costs, and eliminate the risk of avalanches and landslides.

== Other projects ==
=== Overseas infrastructure development ===
Some of these projects carry out some of the development initiatives of the Indian government in foreign territories like Tajikistan, Afghanistan, Myanmar, and Bhutan. These include the Delaram-Zaranj Highway in Afghanistan, completed and handed over to the Afghan government during 2008, and the restoration of the Farkhor and Ayni air bases in Tajikistan.

=== Disaster management and reconstruction ===
The BRO also played a vital role in reconstruction work in the aftermath of the devastating 2004 tsunami in Tamil Nadu, the 2005 Kashmir earthquake, and the 2010 Ladakh flash floods.

== Decorations ==
=== Summary Count ===
Awards attained by BRO personnel between 1960 and 27 January 2024:

- 23 × Kirti Chakra
- 219 × Shaurya Chakra
- 2 × Bar to Shaurya Chakra
- 2 × Padam Shree
- 16 × Param Vishisht Seva Medals
- 49 × Ati Vishist Seva Medals
- 128 × Vishisht Seva Medals
- 29 × Sena Medals
- 3 × Sarvottam Jeevan Raksha Padak
- 20 × Uttam Jeevan Raksha Padak
- 69 × Jeevan Raksha Padak
- 7 x Mentioned in Dispatches
- 7 x Military Unit Citation

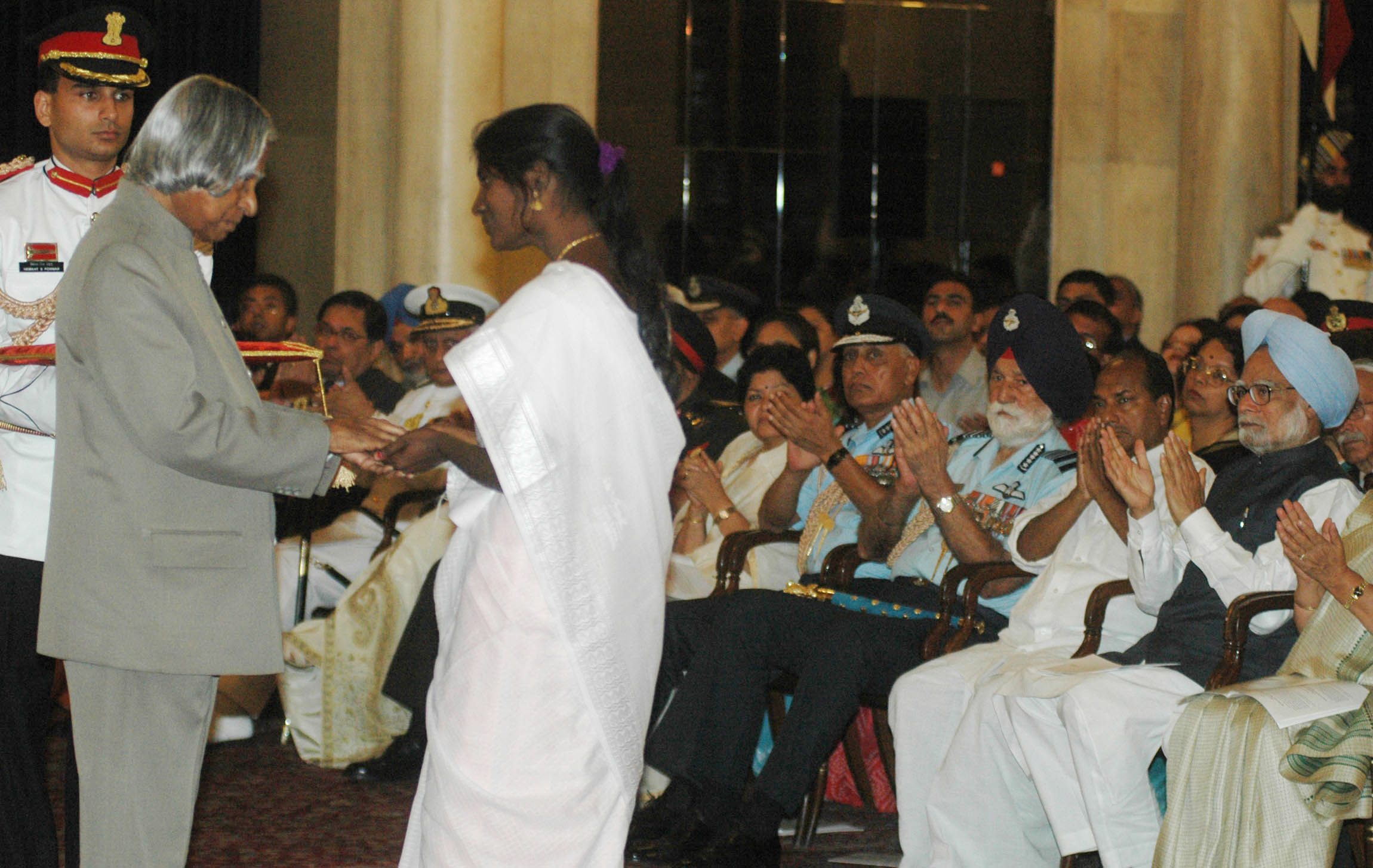
The President, A.P.J. Abdul Kalam, presenting the Shaurya Chakra Award to Mrs. Raji Genesan EX-GS-173840X, Genesan M, BRO (Posthumous) 2007

In 2009, eight Shaurya Chakras, all posthumous, were awarded to BRO personnel for their actions in places such as Afghanistan, Sikkim, the north-east and Jammu and Kashmir. Bulldozer operator Zalim Singh, Bar to the Shaurya Chakra, was crushed by boulders while clearing a strategic road for Indian Army tanks. Two BRO men working on BRO's Project Zaranj in Afghanistan were killed during a suicide bomb attack on Zaranj-Delaram highway. Engineer Santosh Kumar Singh and driver Jaikrit Singh Rawat, while working on the Kishtwar-Sinthan Pass, died in an ambush. Others died or were killed in places such as Meghalaya, Kailash Mansarovar, Kali River, and Hapoli Sarli-Huri road.

=== Recognition ===
In November 2021, BRO received a Guinness World Record for the "highest altitude road" following construction at Umling La. In June 2021, with the assistance of the Border Roads Organisation (BRO), Kanchan Ugursandi made a solo motorcycle expedition to Umling La.

== Gallery ==
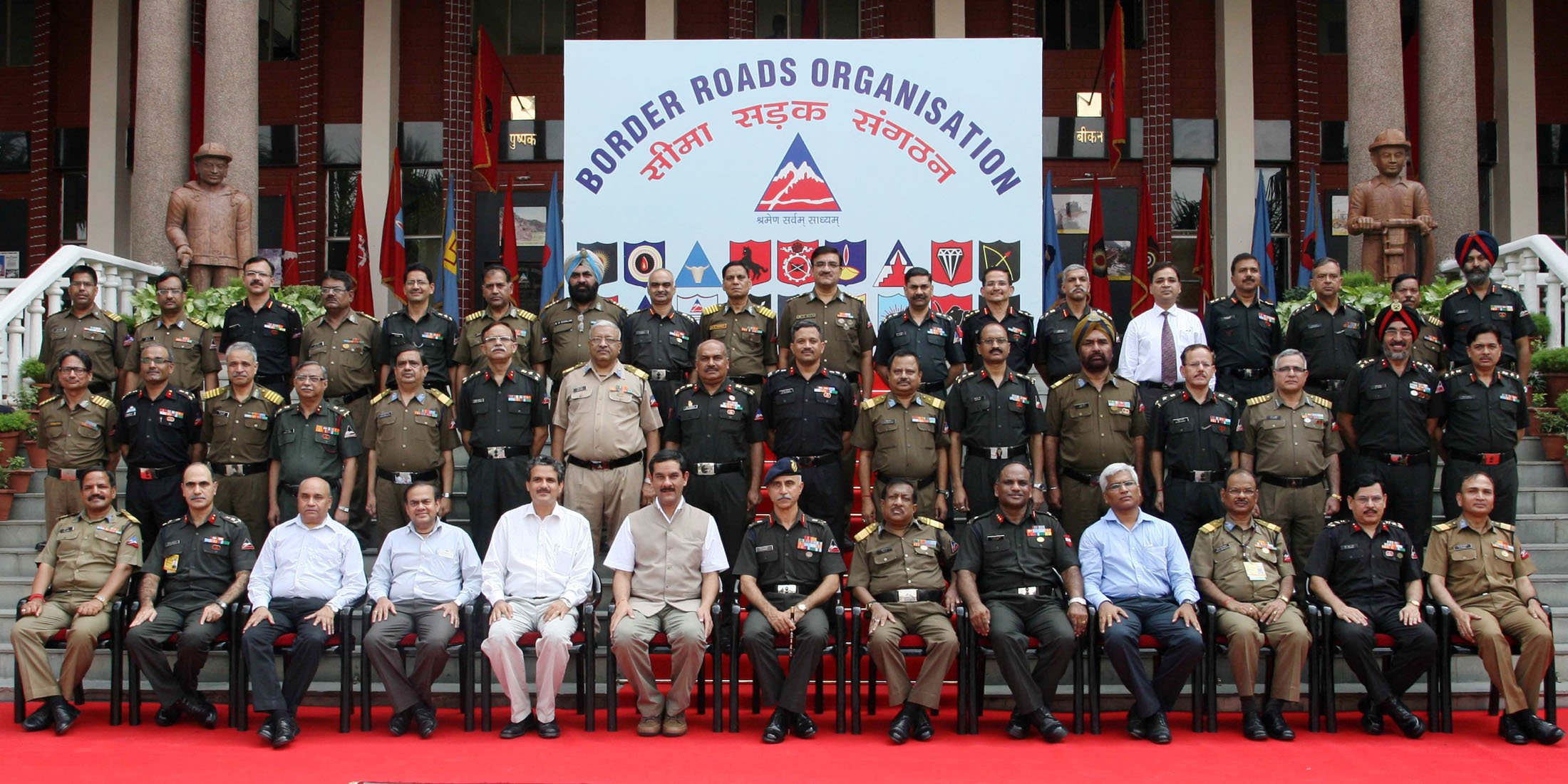
The Minister of State for Defence in a group photograph during the Chief Engineers Conference, organised by the BRO, 2013

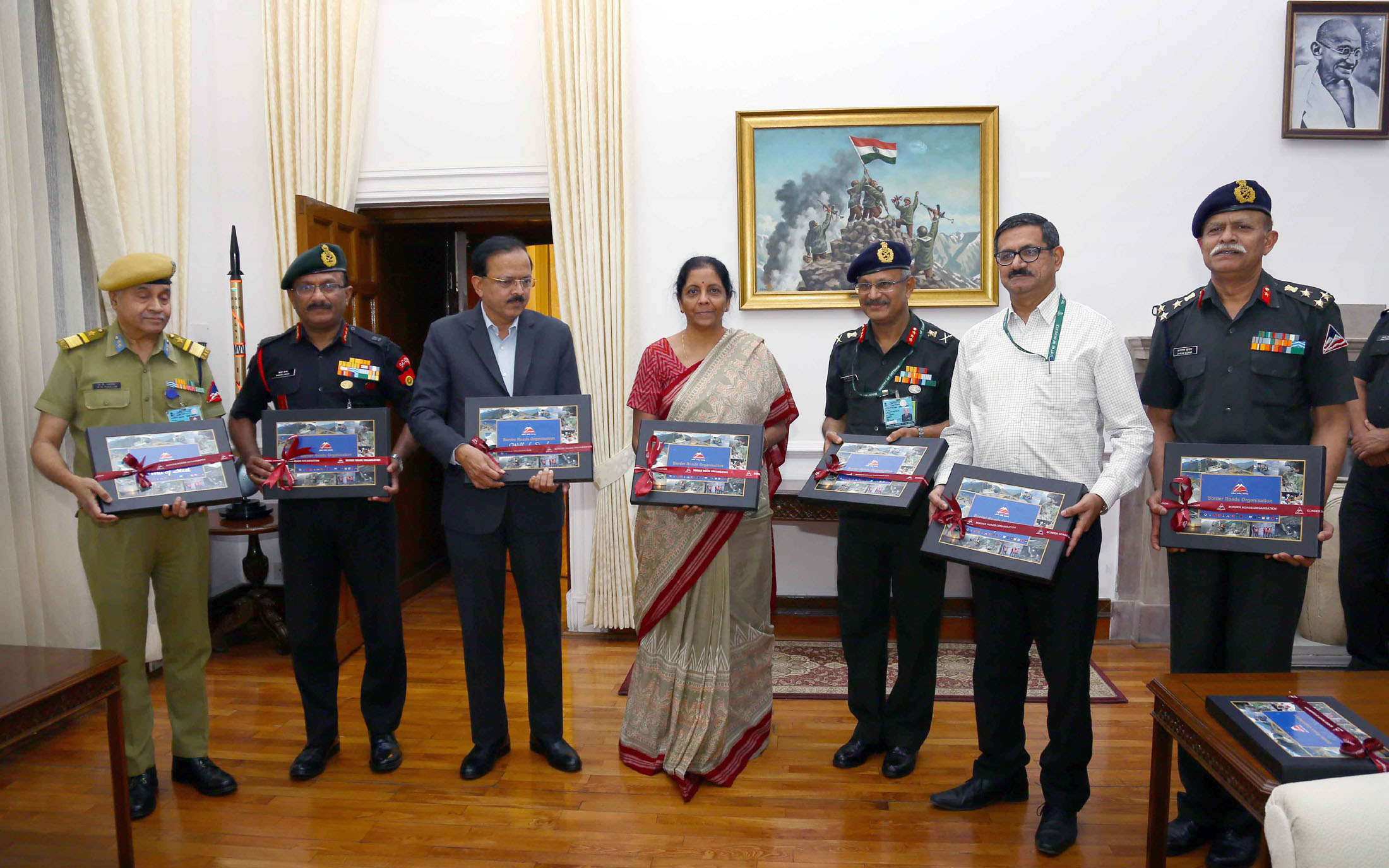
Union Minister for Defence releasing a Border Roads Organisation (BRO) Coffee table book 'Will of Steel', in New Delhi. NSA is also present.

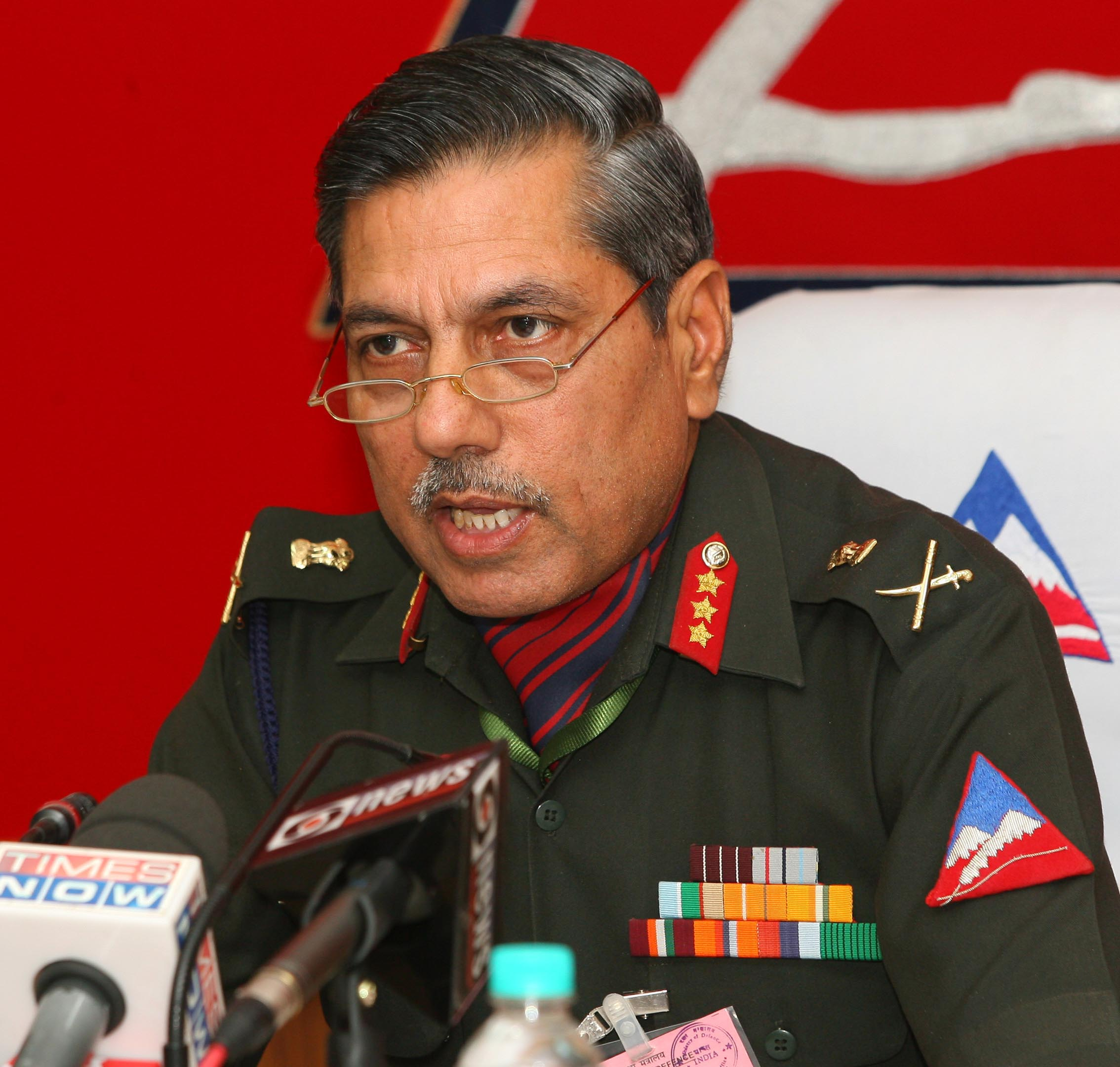
Director General, Border Roads, Lt Gen Arun Kumar Nanda addressing an Annual Press Conference on the eve of 48th Raising Day of the BRO, 2008

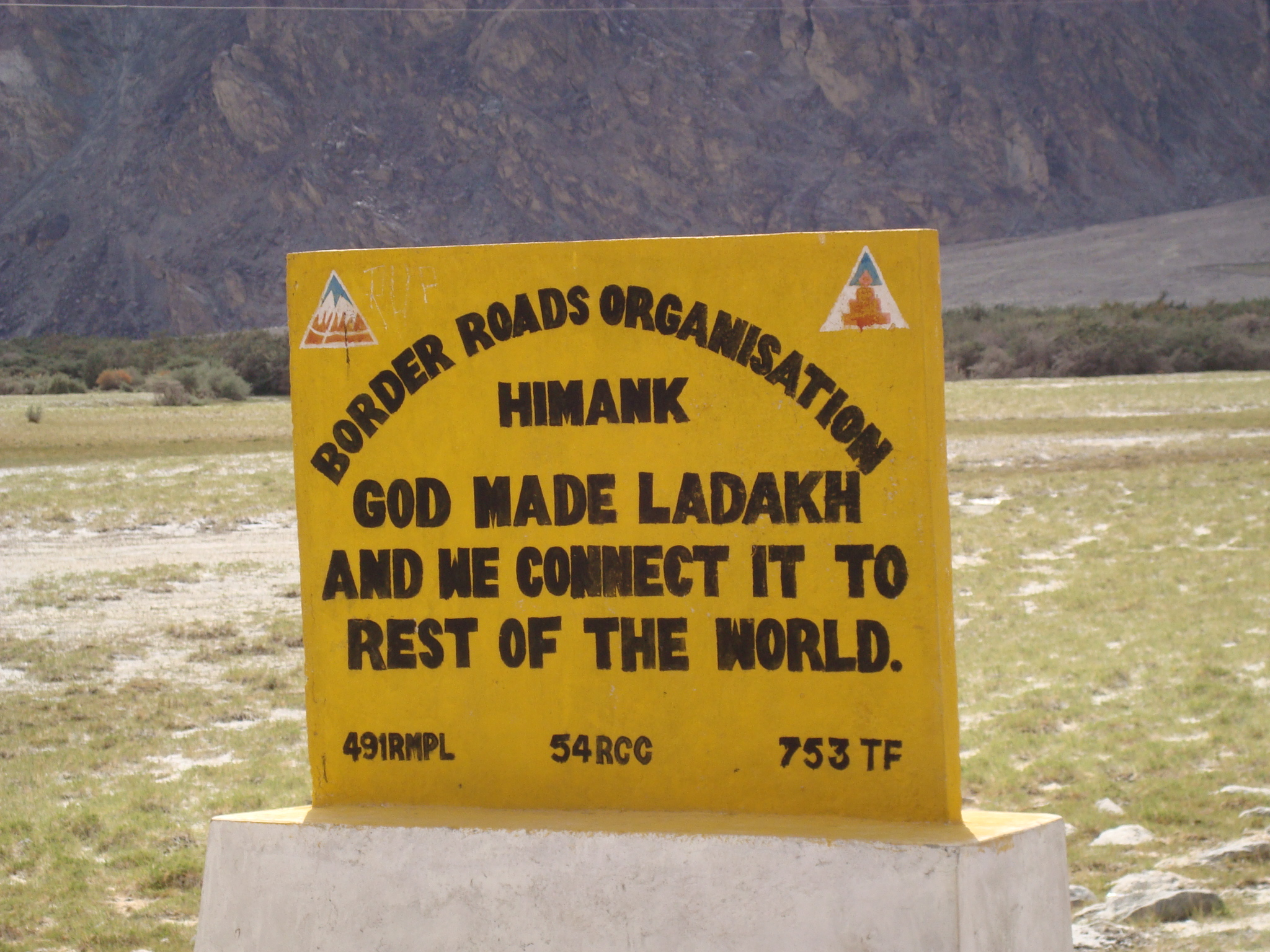
BRO road signs

== See also ==
- Indian Army Corps of Engineers
- Trans-Arunachal Highway
- Mago-Thingbu to Vijaynagar Border Road
- Chota Char Dham Railway
