= Integrated financial advisor (India) =

In the Civil Services of India, an Integrated financial advisor (IFA) is supposedly representative of Ministry of finance and is attached to any executive (higher or equal to the level of level of joint secretary in civil and brigadier in military) to assist it in the exercise of financial powers. The role of Financial Advisor is now considered akin to CFO (Chief Financial Officer) in Corporate Sector. The IFA is of the rank of joint secretary and of additional secretary. The IFA is selected jointly by the administrative machinery and the finance ministry. He or she is under joint control and answerable to both.

The post of IFA was first introduced in the ministry of shipping and transport in 1974 on an experimental basis and after then extended to all ministries of the central government in 1975 and 1976

In defence, the IDAS officers are appointed as IFA. The lower level purchase are being decentralized and IFA acts as approving authority for such purchases. IDAS are recruited through Civil Services Examinations.

This is a very recent phenomenon and is yet to be fully implemented.

== Powers and functions ==
- Helps in presentation of budget.
- Post budget vigilance.
- Scrutiny of projects and program.
- Assist secretary.
- Concurrence to proposals having financial implications
- Costing, Estimation, Benchmarking, Best Practices
