= Project Vartak =

Indian army road engineering project

Vartak
- Founded: 7 May 1960; 66 years ago
- Country: India
- Type: Army, Engineering
- Role: Construction and maintenance of infrastructure in Arunachal Pradesh and adjoining Districts of Assam
- Headquarters: Tezpur, Assam, India
- Motto: Patience – Perseverance – Performance
- Anniversaries: BRO Day: 7 May; Raising Day: 7 May
- Website: https://bro.gov.in

Commanders
- Director General: Lt. Gen. Raghu Srinivasan
- Chief Engineer: Brigadier Harish Kumar

Vartak, also known as Project VARTAK, is a project of the Border Roads Organisation under the Ministry of Defence of India. It was formed on 7 May 1960 as a provision of the 2nd Border Roads Development Board Meeting with the then Prime Minister of India Jawahar Lal Nehru as Project Tusker, which was later renamed Project Vartak in 1963. The initial task of this project was to construct and maintain roads between Bhalukpong and Tenga. It was the first established project of Border Roads Organisation. Its task was later expanded to construct and maintain roads in Arunachal Pradesh and adjoining districts of Assam. Major General O.M Mani was the first Chief Engineer of the project.

Vartak successfully completed its initial task in October 1962, connecting Bhalukpong to Bomdila via Tenga and thus bringing motorable connectivity to these far-flung regions for the first time.

== Works and involvement ==
Over the years, Vartak has become a major candidate for infrastructure development in western Arunachal Pradesh. It has successfully completed massive projects, improving connectivity all around Arunachal Pradesh. It has constructed major bridges and roads connecting the far-flung border areas of Arunachal Pradesh. Some major bridges include Yasong and Sarti bridges, Karteso Kong and Kangdang Sila bridges, Tanchen Panga bridge, Ungu bridge, Siang bridge, Sigit bridge, Sisseri Bridge. Major roads like the Balipara-Charduar-Tawang Axis and the Guwahati-Tawang Axis are important networks for improving connectivity in border areas. Vartak is also constructing numerous tunnels to facilitate all-weather travel in regions where fog is common to shorten travelling time between isolated places in Western Arunachal Pradesh. Major tunnels include the Nechiphu Tunnel and the Sela Tunnel. Many roads connecting Bhalukpong to adjoining districts of Assam are also built. Vartak had earlier constructed infrastructure for universities. Construction of residential accommodation, development of internal roads in Tezpur University, construction of the Degree & Diploma Academic blocks, and residential accommodation for the North Eastern Regional Institute of Science and Technology(NERIST), Itanagar and the construction of residential school with boy's and girl's hostel for Jawahar Navodaya Vidyalaya at Gorponding in Tawang, as part of the Rural Education Development Programme are the major works. Deposit works from various agencies like North East Council (NEC), North Eastern Electrical Power Corporation (NEEPCO) and Oil India were undertaken by this Project The headquarters of Vartak in Tezpur also hosts a primary school within it offering primary education for the children of the personnels as well as civilians.

Vartak specializes in constructing motorable roads and bridges in mountainous regions bringing connectivity to many isolated towns in Western Arunachal Pradesh.

== Command structure ==
Vartak initially started with four Task Forces. These Task Forces were spread across various regions, each specializing in different works.

Initial Task Forces
Task Force	Location
1 BRTF	Likabali
7 BRTF	Basar, Arunachal Pradesh
3 BRTF	Moridhal – Sassi – Burgaon region
14 BRTF	Bhalukpong – Tenga – Tawang Axis

Between 1967 and 1971, there was a major reorganization of Task Forces. 7 Border Roads Task Force was disbanded in April 1967. 4 Border Roads Task Force was re-organised as 39 Maintenance Task Force and in January 1971 moved to Dimwe in Lohit District and subsequently renamed as 48 Border Roads Task Force. 3 Border Roads Task Force was renamed as 44 Maintenance Task Force in September 1970 and re-organised as 44 Border Roads Task Force in May 1972 . 1310 Fractional Task Force was raised in April 1984, re-organised in December 1986 as 756 Border Roads Task Force and was located at Ziro. 756 Task Force Headquarters subsequently to moved Naharlagun in February 1998. To cope up with the increased work load two new Task Forces were introduced, 763 Border Roads Task Force and 42 Border Roads Task Force. 48 Border Roads Task Force was later merged with Project Udayak. Subsequently, 756 Border Roads Task Force and 44 Border Roads Task Force were merged with Project Arunak to ease the workload.

== Bridge construction ==
In 1986, Border Roads Organisation decided to go in for construction of permanent bridges departmentally. This resulted in the creation of a Bridge Construction Company, 1441 BCC, which was allotted to Vartak. The first bridge constructed by 1441 BCC was a pre-stressed concrete bridge Kamla II on the Balipara – Charduar – Tawang road. Subsequently, six more permanent bridges were completed by 1993. 1441 BCC continues to construct high-quality permanent bridges, even at altitudes of over 10,000 feet and across swift mountain rivers in Arunachal Pradesh and Assam.

== Major works ==
Works	Notes
Tawang Axis	Guwahati to Tawang route boosting border connectivity.
Balipara - Charduar - Tawang Axis	Increasing connectivity to the Indo-Chinese Border in Tawang.
Trans Arunachal Highway (NH-13)	Part of Balipara - Charduar - Tawang Road developed to NHDL specifications.
SARDP-NE	Development of Roads and Highways in North-Eastern India.
Sela Tunnel	An All-weather connectivity between Guwahati and Tawang in the Indian state of Arunachal Pradesh. The tunnel is being excavated below the 4,200 metres Sela Pass. To be completed in mid-2022.
Nechiphu Tunnel	Constructed along the Balipara - Charduar - Tawang Axis. To be completed in early-2022.
