= Project Dantak =

Military roads engineering project

Dantak
- Founded: 24 April 1961; 65 years ago
- Country: IndiaBhutan
- Type: Army, Engineering
- Role: Construction and maintenance of infrastructure in Bhutan and adjoining Indian Districts
- Size: 1200+ personnel (Indian Officials)
- Part of: Indian Armed Forces, Border Roads Organisation, Ministry of Defence
- Headquarters: Simtokha, Thimphu, Bhutan
- Motto: Shramena Sarvam Sadhyam
- Anniversaries: BRO Day: 7 May; Raising Day: 24 April
- Website: bro.gov.in

Commanders
- Director General: Lt. Gen. Harpal Singh
- Chief Engineer: Brigadier Jitender Singh Dhadwal

Dantak, also known as Project DANTAK, is an overseas project of the Border Roads Organisation under the Ministry of Defence of India. Project DANTAK was established on 24 April 1961 as a result of an agreement between Jigme Dorji Wangchuck, the third king of Bhutan and then Prime Minister of India Jawahar Lal Nehru. Colonel T.V. Jaganathan was appointed as the first Chief Engineer of DANTAK. The project is involved in identifying the most important aspects of connectivity and in spurring the socio-economic development and growth of Bhutan. It is tasked to construct and maintain roads suitable for motorised transportation in Bhutan and was established under the provision of the Indo-Bhutan Treaty of Peace and Friendship, 1949.

== Works and involvement ==
The project also constructs infrastructure in adjoining Indian districts, some of the important ones include Sherbathang–Nathu La road, Gangtok–Sherbathang road and Sevoke–Gangtok road.

The medical and education facilities established by DANTAK in outlying areas were the first in those regions. The Takthi Canteen, commonly known as the DANTAK canteen midway between Phuentsholing and Thimphu is a major stop for travelers.

The project recruits local workers from Bhutan as well as Indian workers from adjoining districts like Jaigaon, Alipurduar and other parts of Eastern and North-Eastern India under a basic monthly wage. It posts officials from India for the supervision of work.

In 2022, Dantak resurfaced 4.5 kilometres (2.8 mi) of the Phuentsholing-Thimphu Road with shredded plastic as part of a special campaign to conduct trials of using recycled plastic in road construction.

== Controversies and incidents ==
=== Tricolour themed reflectors ===
The Bhutanese Government said that DANTAK has installed Indian tricolour themed raised pavement marker or reflectors on the highway railings. After DANTAK confirmed their presence, those reflectors were immediately replaced. Later, the Chief Engineer of DANTAK stated that no tricolour themed reflectors were sanctioned to be installed and ground labourers had installed those reflectors enthusiastically.

=== Wangchhu bridge collapse ===
A 204 metres long bridge in Haa along the Damchu-Haa road collapsed in February 2021, leaving 3 workers dead and 6 missing. The bridge was pending load testing when the incident happened. The bridge was handed over to Project DANTAK by the contractor. Rescue operations were initiated but were soon ceased due to low visibility and risk from the fragile structures.

== Major works ==
Works	Location	Notes
Paro Airport	Paro	Built in 1968 as an airstrip for on-call helicopter services for the Indian Armed Forces. Now used as an international airport.
Yonphula Airfield	Near Trashigang	Domestic Airport in Bhutan
Thimphu – Trashigang Highway	Thimphu – Trashigang	Major Highway in Bhutan
Damchu-Chukha Road	Damchu-Chukha	Major Road in Bhutan
India House Estate	Thimphu	The Indian Embassy in Bhutan
