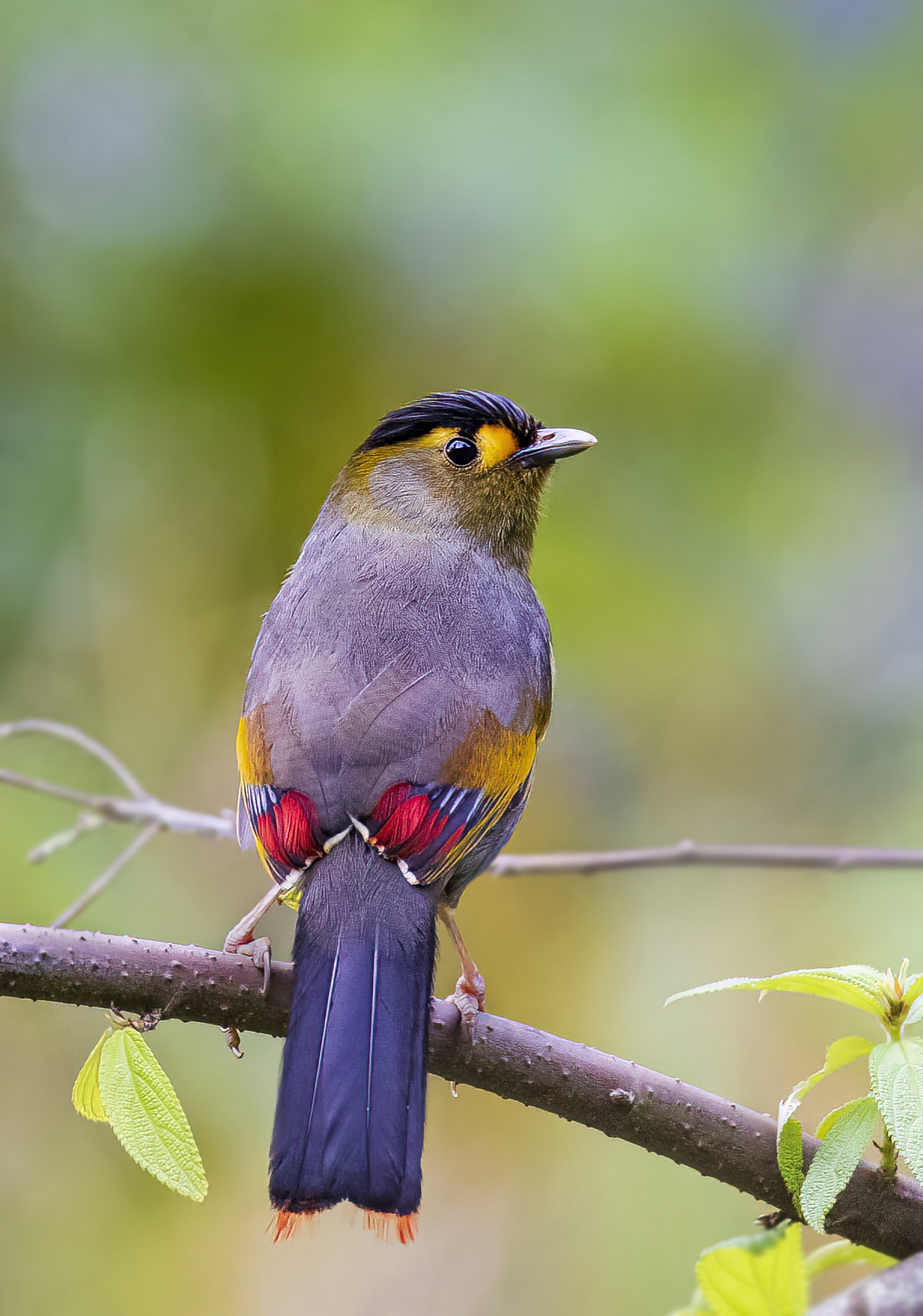

Conservation status
- Critically Endangered (IUCN 3.1)

Scientific classification
- Kingdom: Animalia
- Phylum: Chordata
- Class: Aves
- Order: Passeriformes
- Family: Leiothrichidae
- Genus: Liocichla
- Species: L. bugunorum

Binomial name
- Liocichla bugunorum Athreya, 2006
- Distribution of Bugun liocichla

= Bugun liocichla =

Species of bird

The Bugun liocichla (Liocichla bugunorum) is a passerine bird species from the family Leiothrichidae closely related to the Emei Shan liocichla. First spotted in 1995 in Arunachal Pradesh, India, it was described as a new species in 2006. The description was made without the collection of a type specimen as they were too few to risk killing one. It is thought to be an endangered species, with a small population, and a very restricted distribution range within which commercial development threatens the habitat.

== Description ==
The Bugun liocichla is a small laughingthrush (20 cm (7.9 in)) with olive-grey plumage and a black cap. The face is marked with prominent orange-yellow lores, and the wings have yellow, red and white patches. The tail is black with crimson coloured undertail coverts and red tips. The feet are pink and the bill is black at the face fading to pale white. A second duller individual was mist netted, which was probably the female. The voice is described as fluty and distinctive.

A study of the evolution of the species within the genus Liocichla based on mitochondrial DNA sequence similarity showed that the species is most closely related to L. omeiensis with the Hengduan Mountains possibly acting as the isolating barrier between the two.

== Distribution and habitat ==
All sightings of the species have been at an altitude of 2,000 m (6,600 ft) on disturbed hillsides covered with shrubs and small trees, with the exception of one sighting on the edge of primary forest. It lives in a territory similar to that of the Emei Shan liocichla. Small flocks were observed during January, whereas pairs were observed in May, with an estimated total of 14 individuals. It is thought that pairs may hold and defend territories. The Bugun liocichla is only currently known from just one location. Populations may be discovered in other areas of Arunachal Pradesh or neighbouring Bhutan.

Attempts have been made to identify new locations where the species could occur based on identification of suitable habitats using computational models.

== Species discovery ==
- - - - L. phoenicea
      - L. ripponi
    - - L. bugunorum
      - L. omeiensis
  - L. steerii

Relationship among liocichlas

The species was described in 2006 after being discovered in Eaglenest Wildlife Sanctuary in Arunachal Pradesh, India, by an astrophysicist, Ramana Athreya. The species was first spotted in the sanctuary in 1995 but was not seen again for ten years. Athreya spotted them again in January 2005 but did not publicize it until he was able to confirm it to be a new species. It was initially identified as appearing most similar to an Emei Shan liocichla, Liocichla omeiensis, a species of Liocichla endemic to China. It was, however, distinctly different and the full description was finally made by capturing and examining two individuals using mistnets, in May 2006. Due to the apparent rarity of the species no type specimen was collected, instead feathers from the mist net, photographs, recordings and notes were used as the holotype. The International Code of Zoological Nomenclature does not allow for new species to be described without the collection of type specimens, but this provision was circumvented in this case by the collection of feathers (the Code allows for "any part of an animal" to be treated as a type specimen; Art. 72.5.1). The 1991 description of the Bulo Burti boubou (Laniarius liberatus), an African bushshrike species later considered invalid, lacked a specimen and only blood samples were collected and has been more controversial. A detailed review of the discovery of the species was published in 2007.

The first report of the species was made in a posting to Nathistory-India, an electronic mailing list in 1996. It was only in 2006, however, that the species was formally described.

=== Taxonomy and systematics ===
The species' scientific and common names are derived from the Bugun tribe in whose communal forests the species was discovered.

The species is a sister of Liocichla omeiensis and the speciation may have been caused by the isolating geographic barrier of the Hengduan mountains.

== Threats and conservation ==
For a "spectacular bird" with distinctive calls to have been overlooked until 1995 suggests that the species is not common. Only three breeding pairs are currently known and it's listed as critically endangered. While the species is capable of living in degraded forests, its small population is considered threatened, especially in the light of plans to build a highway through an area thought to be its primary habitat.
