= Ramana Athreya =

Indian astronomer

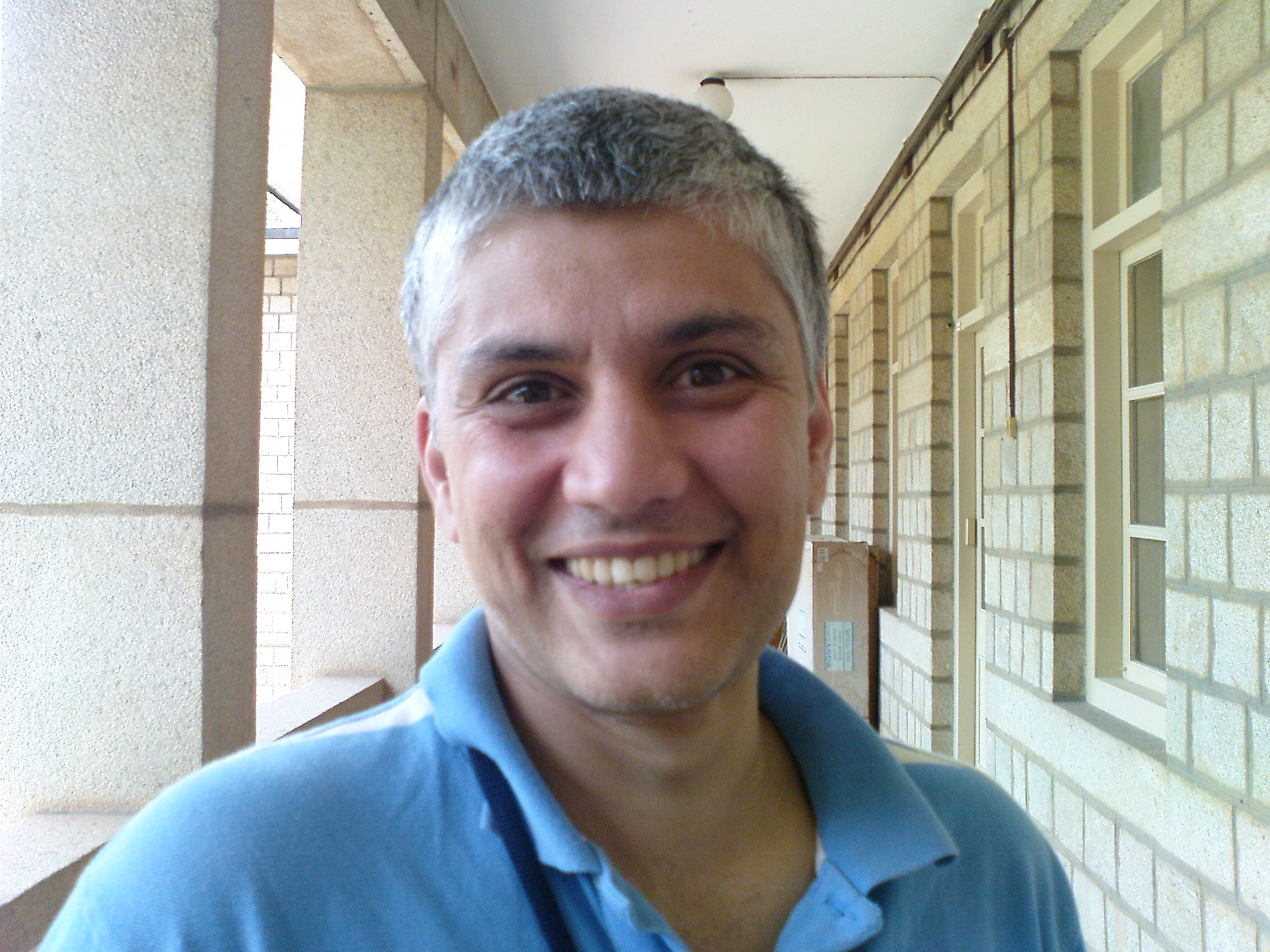
- Ramana Athreya at Raman Research Institute, Bangalore
- Born: Bangalore, Karnataka
- Known for: Discovery of Bugun liocichla
- Awards: Whitley award by Whitley Fund for Nature
- Scientific career
- Fields: Astrophysics, Ornithology
- Workplaces: Indian Institute of Science Education and Research, Pune
- Website: www.iiserpune.ac.in/~rathreya/

Ramana Athreya is a birdwatcher and an astronomer at the Indian Institute of Science Education and Research Pune. In 2006, he described a new species of bird, the Bugun liocichla from the Eaglenest Wildlife Sanctuary in western Arunachal Pradesh, North-east India. This discovery has been described by BirdLife International as the most sensational ornithological discovery in India for more than half a century. He was awarded the Pakshishree award in 2009 for this discovery by the government of Rajasthan. In May 2011, he was conferred the Whitley Award, one of seven people awarded in the year, for his work on conservation and involving communities in Eaglenest Wildlife Sanctuary.
