= Cyrtodactylus hantu =

Scientific classification
- Kingdom: Animalia
- Phylum: Chordata
- Class: Reptilia
- Order: Squamata
- Suborder: Gekkota
- Family: Gekkonidae
- Genus: Cyrtodactylus
- Species: C. hantu

Binomial name
- Cyrtodactylus hantu Davis, Das, Leaché, Karin, Brennan, Jackman, Nashriq, Chan, & Bauer, 2021

Species of lizard

Cyrtodactylus hantu is a species of gecko that is endemic to Sarawak in Malaysian Borneo. The specific name hantu is the Malay word for "ghost".

Cyrtodactylus hantu can reach at least 73 mm (2.9 in) in snout–vent length.
