= Tioman Island rock gecko =

Conservation status
- Least Concern (IUCN 3.1)

Scientific classification
- Kingdom: Animalia
- Phylum: Chordata
- Class: Reptilia
- Order: Squamata
- Suborder: Gekkota
- Family: Gekkonidae
- Genus: Cnemaspis
- Species: C. limi

Binomial name
- Cnemaspis limi Das & Grismer, 2003
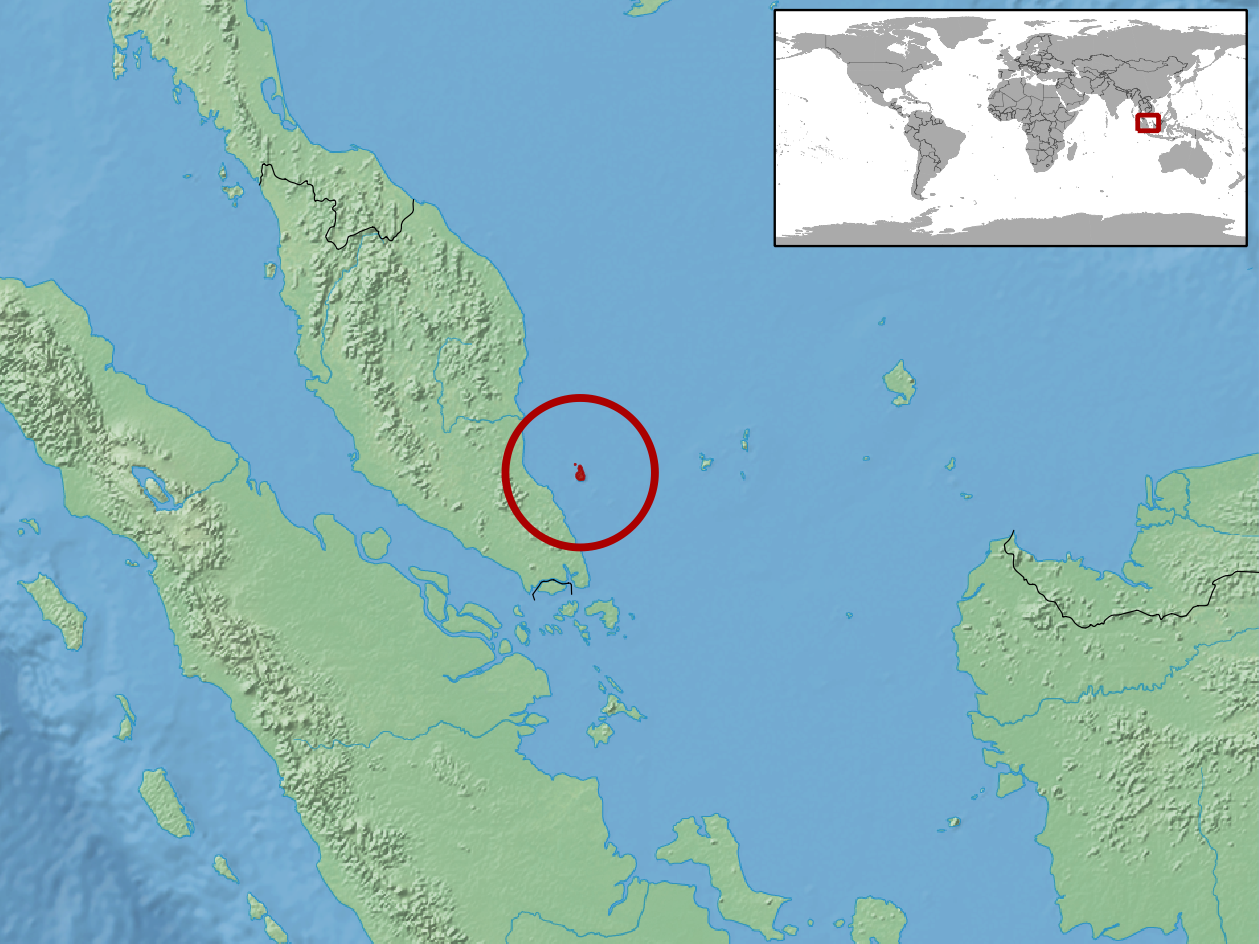

Species of lizard

The Tioman Island rock gecko (Cnemaspis limi), also known commonly as the Tioman round-eyed gecko, is a species of gecko, a lizard in the family Gekkonidae. The species is endemic to Malaysia.

== Etymology ==
The specific name, limi, is in honour of zoologist Kok Peng "Kelvin" Lim (born 1966) of the Raffles Museum, Singapore.

== Description ==
C. limi may attain a snout-to-vent length (SVL) of 8.8 cm (3.5 in). It has 8–12 upper labials, and 7–10 lower labials. The ventral scales are weakly keeled. It is brown-coloured, with large, black, rounded spots on the nape and anterior part of the body, and with small, white, randomly arranged body tubercles.

== Geographic range ==
C. limi is found only on Tioman Island (also called Pulau Tioman) in Western Malaysia.

== Habitat ==
The preferred natural habitat of C. limi is large boulders in forest, at altitudes from sea level to 1,026 m (3,366 ft).

== Behaviour ==
C. limi is terrestrial and saxicolous (rock-dwelling).

== Diet ==
C. limi preys upon ants, beetles, caterpillars, and grasshoppers.

== Reproduction ==
C. limi is oviparous. Clutch size is one or two eggs. The species breeds throughout the year.
