= Eaglenest Wildlife Sanctuary =

Protected area of Arunachal Pradesh, India

- IUCN category IV (habitat/species management area)
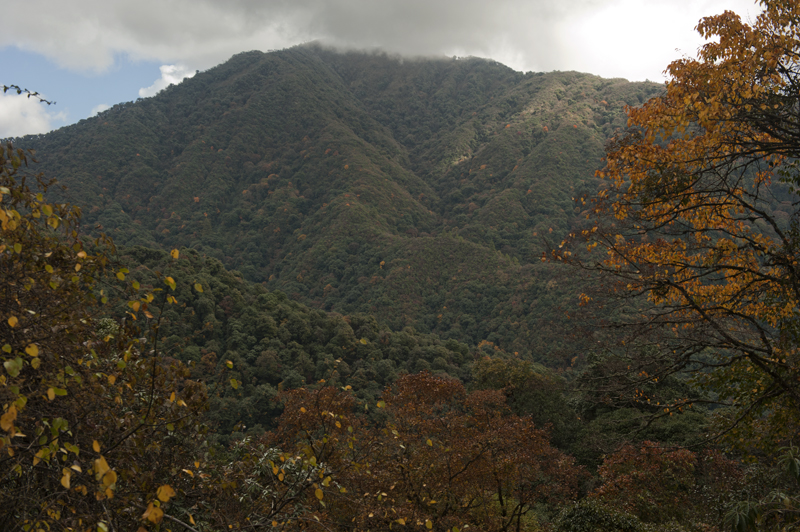
- View of Eaglenest forest canopy

- Location within Arunachal Pradesh Location within India
- Interactive map of Eaglenest Wildlife Sanctuary
- Location: West Kameng, Arunachal Pradesh, India
- Coordinates: 27°06′0″N 92°24′0″E
- Area: 218 square kilometres (84 sq mi)
- Established: 1989
- Visitors: 75 (in 2006)
- Governing body: Government of Arunachal Pradesh

Eaglenest Wildlife Sanctuary is a protected area of India in the Himalayan foothills of West Kameng District, Arunachal Pradesh. It conjoins Sessa Orchid Sanctuary to the northeast and Pakke Tiger Reserve across the Kameng river to the east. Elevation ranges from 500 to 3,250 m (1,640 to 10,660 ft). It is a part of the Kameng Elephant Reserve.

Eaglenest Wildlife Sanctuary derives its name from Red Eagle Division of the Indian army which was posted in the area in the 1950s.

== Geography and climate ==
Eaglenest and Sessa Orchid Sanctuary together occupy a rough east–west rectangle with Sessa occupying the northeast quadrant. Eaglenest is bounded to the north by Eaglenest Ridge and the reserved forests of the Bugun community (Lama Camp area). Eaglenest adjoins Tawang district to the north. The Bhalukpong–Bomdila highway (and Pakke immediately beyond) are its eastern boundary. There are no distinct geographical features delineating its western boundary along the Bhutan border and the southern boundary at about 27° N latitude.

Eaglenest and Sessa ridges rise to 3,250 metres (10,663 ft) and 3,150 metres (10,335 ft) respectively and are the first major barriers to the monsoon as it moves north from the plains of Assam. These ridges get over 3,000 millimetres (120 in) of rain on the southern slopes and about 1,500 millimetres (59 in) on the northern ones.

The eastern half of Eaglenest and Sessa sanctuaries is drained by the Tippi Naala (Tippi river) which joins the Kameng river at Tippi village on the Bhalukpong–Bomdila highway. Several smaller streams including Buhiri Nadi and Dihung Nadi in the western half of the area flow down to join the Brahmaputra separately.

Eaglenest Wildlife Sanctuary is part of the Kameng protected area complex (KPAC), the largest contiguous closed-canopy forest tract of Arunachal Pradesh, which includes Eaglenest, Pakke, Sessa, Nameri, and Sonai Rupai sanctuaries and associated reserved forest blocks. The complex covers 3500 km^{2} in area and ranges from 100 metres (328 ft) to 3,300 metres (10,827 ft) in altitude.

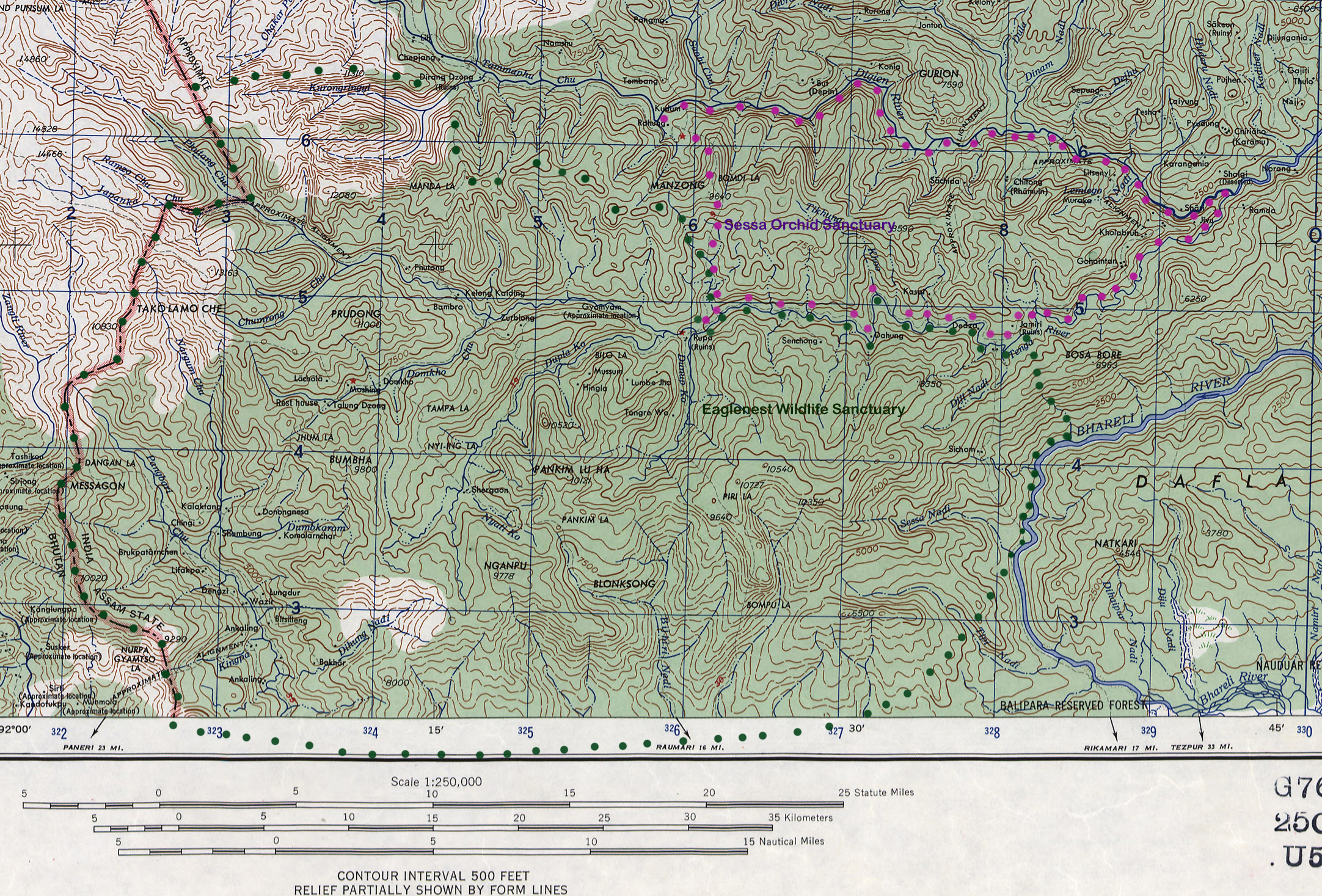
Topography of Eaglenest and Sessa Sanctuaries

Eaglenest has an unpaved road running from its base to Eaglenest pass at 2,800 metres (9,186 ft) allowing good access to the entire altitudinal range, making it accessible to the military, scientists and ecotourists.

== Fauna ==
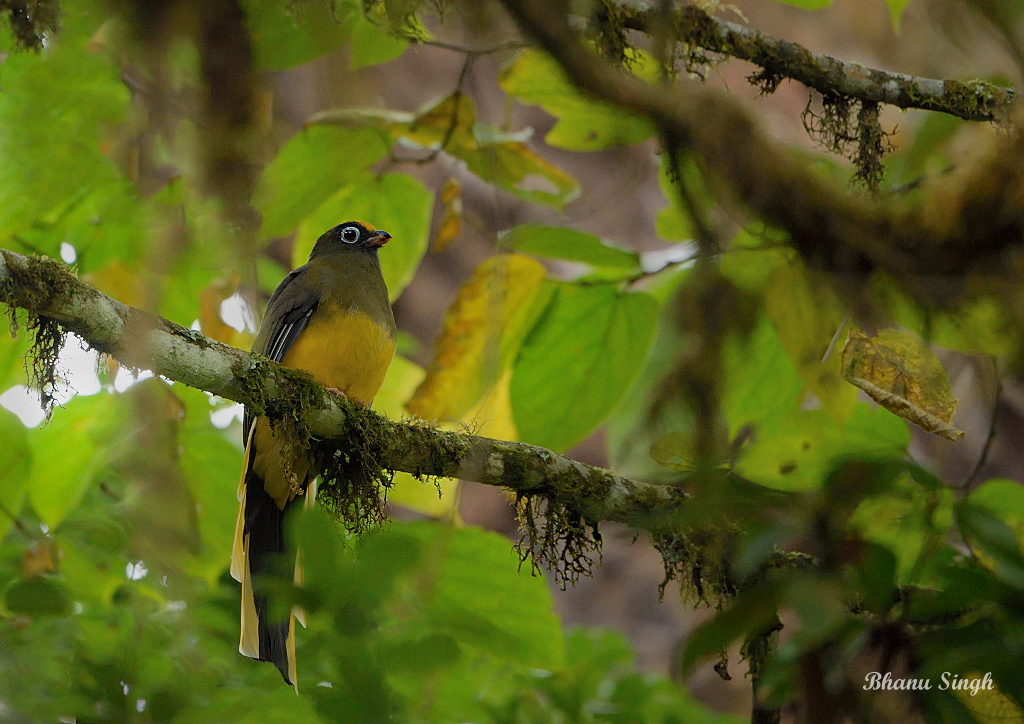
Wards Trogon at Eaglenest Pass

=== Birds ===
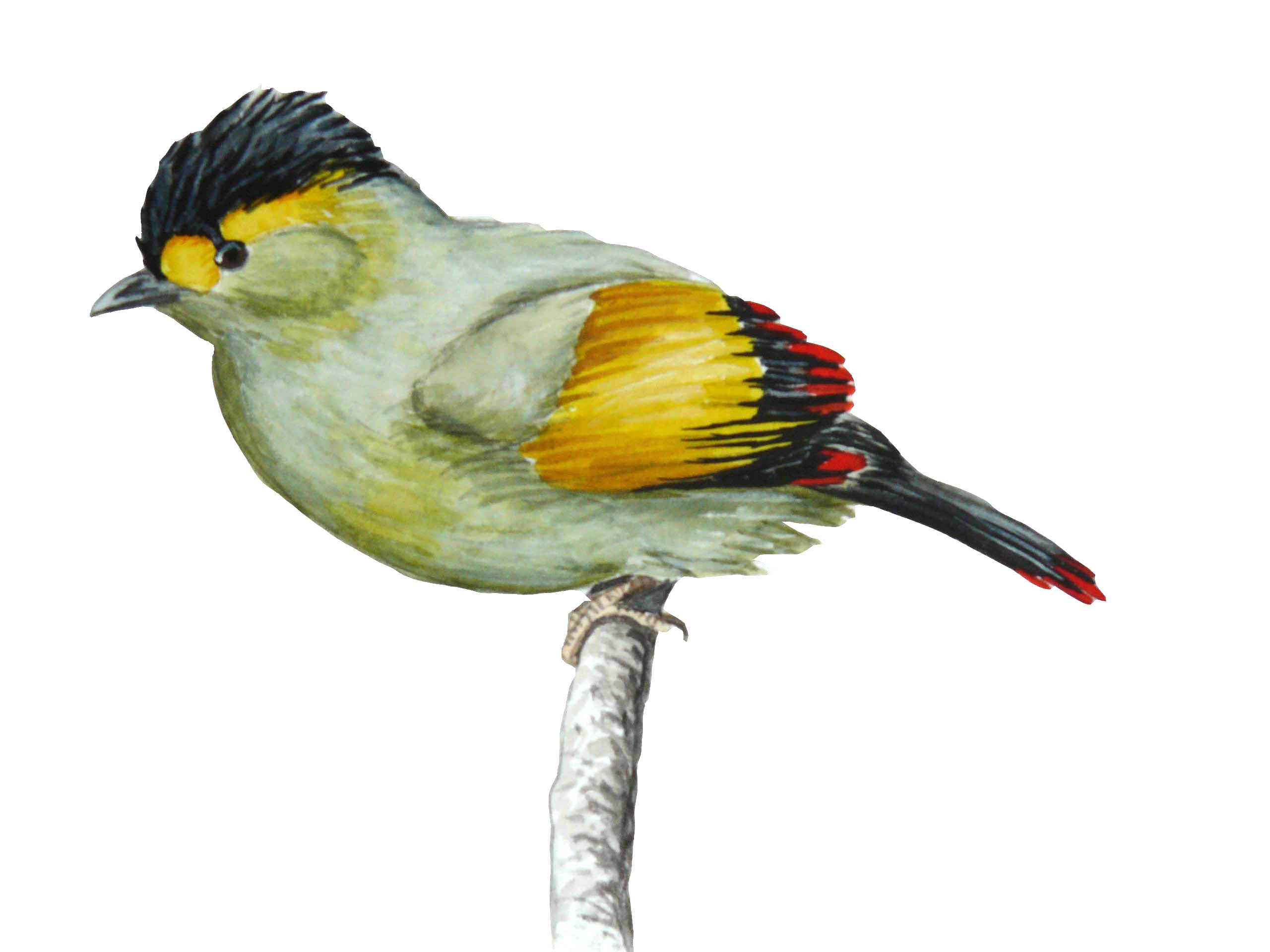
Bugun liocichla was discovered at Eaglenest Wildlife Sanctuary in 1995.

Eaglenest Wildlife Sanctuary is well known as a major birding area. It is home to at least 454 species of birds including 3 cormorants, 5 herons, black stork, Oriental white (black-headed) ibis, 4 ducks, 20 hawks, eagles, kites, harriers and vultures, 3 falcons, 10 pheasants, junglefowl, quail, and peafowl, black-necked crane, 3 rails, 6 plovers, dotterels, and lapwings, 7 waders, ibisbill, Indian Thick-knee, small pratincole, 2 gulls, 14 pigeons, 3 parrots, 15 cuckoos, 10 owls, 2 nightjars, 4 swifts, 2 trogons, 7 kingfishers, 2 bee-eaters, 2 rollers, hoopoes, 4 hornbills, 6 barbets, 14 woodpeckers, 2 broadbills, 2 pittas, 2 larks, 6 martins, 7 wagtails, 9 shrikes, 9 bulbuls, 4 fairy-bluebirds, 3 shrike, brown dipper, 3 accentors, 46 thrushes, 65 Old World flycatchers, 6 parrotbills, 31 warblers, 25 flycatchers, 10 tits, 5 nuthatches, 3 treecreepers, 5 flowerpeckers, 8 sunbirds, Indian white-eye, 3 bunting, 14 finches, 2 munia, 3 sparrows, 5 starlings, 2 orioles, 7 drongos, ashy woodswallow and 9 jays. The sanctuary has the distinction of having three tragopan species, perhaps unique in India.

Eaglenest is the site where Bugun liocichla was first discovered in 1995 and again observed and described in 2006 by Ramana Athreya.

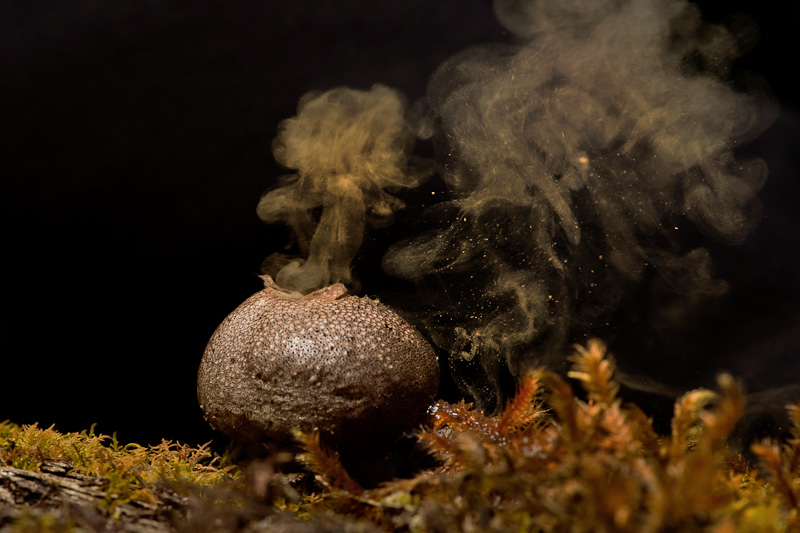
Puffball mushroom from Eaglenest WLS, Arunachal Pradesh, India

=== Herpetofauna ===
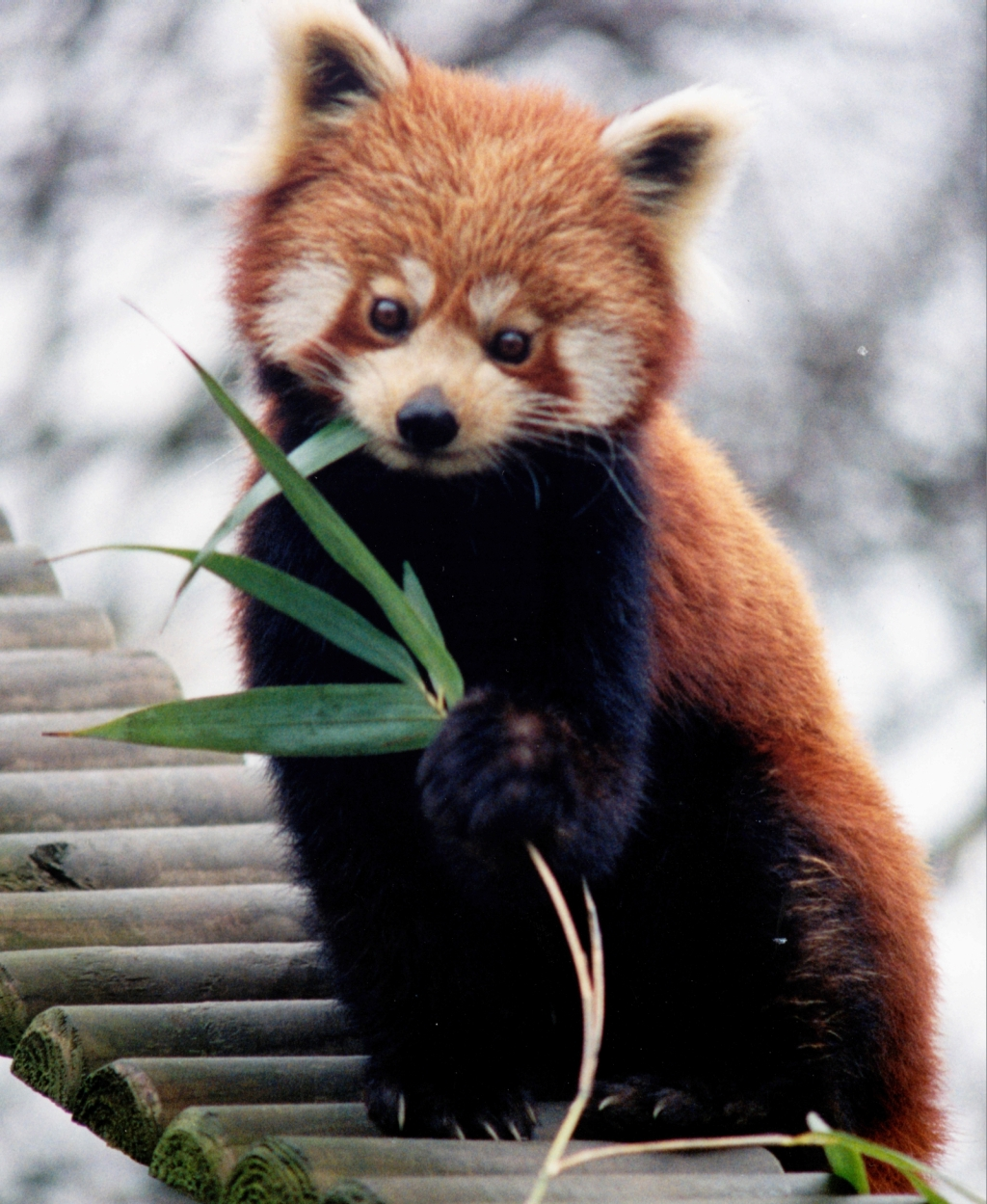
Red panda

Eaglenest Wildlife Sanctuary is home to a wide variety of herpetofauna including at least 34 species of amphibians, 24 species of snakes and 7 species of lizards including 3 geckos, 3 agamids and 4 skinks. Abor Hills agama was rediscovered at Eaglenest after 125 years. Other rare species include the Darjeeling false-wolfsnake which was only known to science through five specimens, Anderson's mountain lizard, Günther's kukri snake, common slug snake, and keelback snakes which have not been definitively identified.

=== Mammals ===
Eaglenest Wildlife Sanctuary provides habitat to clouded leopard, marbled cat, Asian golden cat and leopard cat. Other mammal species include the endangered capped langur, red panda, Asiatic black bear and the vulnerable Arunachal macaque and gaur. It was here that a new taxon of primate was discovered in 1997 by noted primatologist of northeast India Dr Anwaruddin Choudhury, but he thought it to be a new subspecies of Tibetan or Pere David's macaque. It was described as a new species, i.e., Arunachal macaque in 2004. The highest elevation (11,000 ft) that the wild Asian elephants reach anywhere is partly in this sanctuary.

=== Butterflies ===
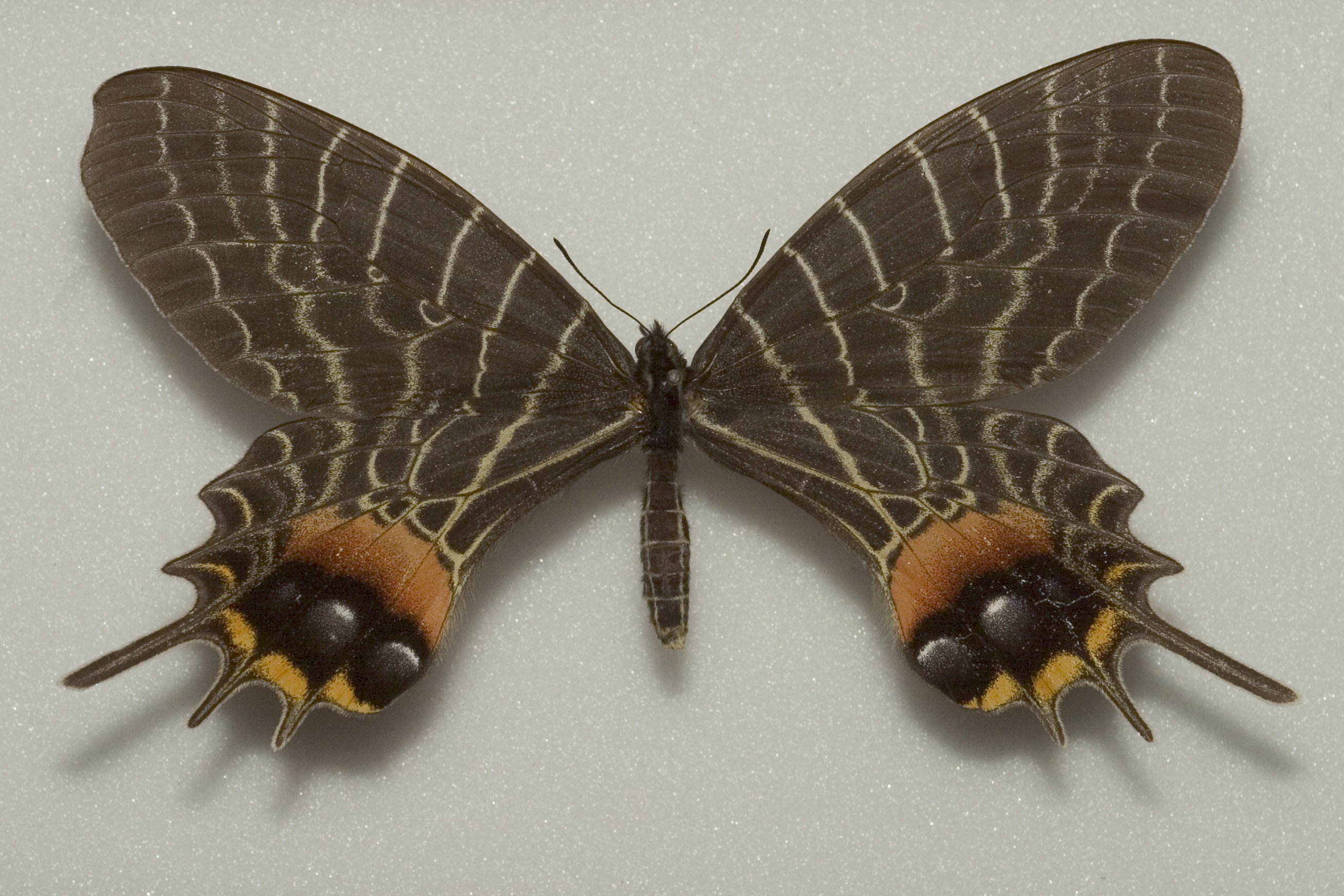
Bhutan glory

Eaglenest Wildlife Sanctuary is home to at least 165 species of butterflies including Bhutan glory, grey admiral, scarce red-forester, dusky labyrinth, tigerbrown, jungle-queen sp, white-edged bushbrown, and white owl.

== Flora ==
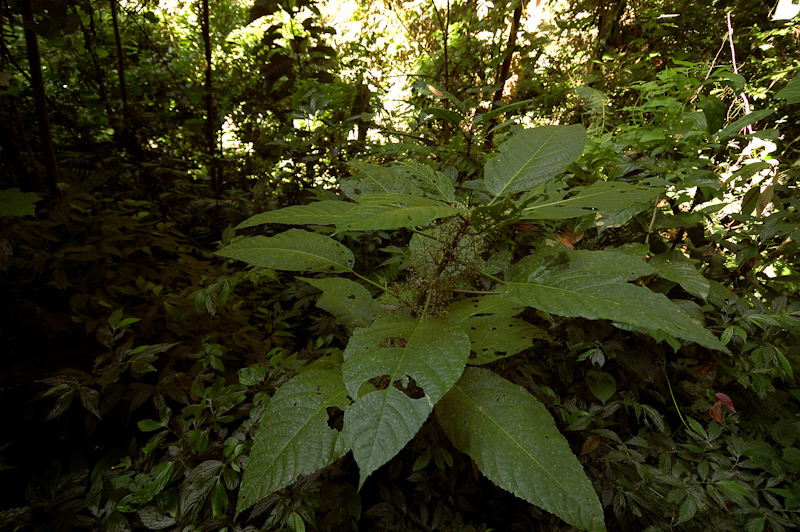
Elephant nettle at Eaglenest WS

In Eaglenest Wildlife Sanctuary there is a camp named Sessni which in Nepali language means nettle. The place is filled with poisonous elephant nettles on either side of the road.

== Conservation ==
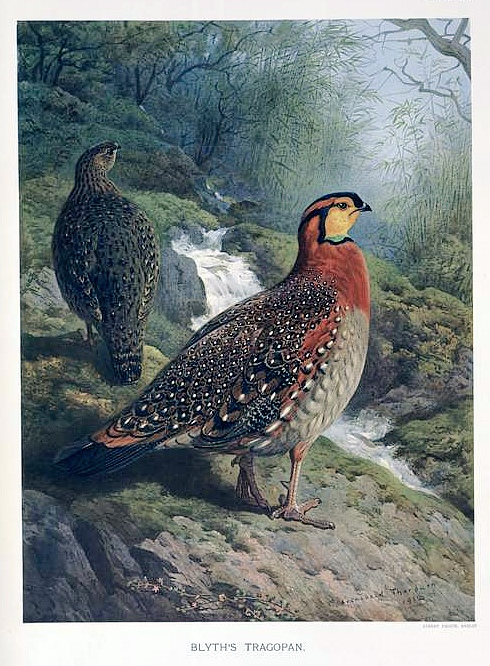
Blyth's tragopan

Eaglenest Wildlife Sanctuary is physically protected from timber and animal poaching only by its isolation and the poor quality of the one lane road leading inside it. It is administered by the Divisional Forest Officer, Shergaon Forest Division, Rupa (Millo Tasser, IFS). He is assisted by a Range Forest Office in Singchung and Beat Forest Offices in Ramalingam (close to Singchung) and Khellong. The absence of any settlement inside Eaglenest has minimized any problem of hunting.

The Critical Ecosystem Partnership Fund (CEPF), a consortium of major international and regional organizations, has identified the Eastern Himalayan region around Arunachal Pradesh (Nepal, Bhutan and all of Northeast India) as a critical global biodiversity rich area deserving of conservation focus. They identified the North Bank Landscape (i.e., north bank of Brahmaputra, extending up the Eaglenest slopes) and the Tawang region as worthy of particular focus.

Eaglenest Wildlife Sanctuary is in the Conservation International Himalaya Biodiversity Hotspot area.

BirdLife International has designated Eaglenest and Sessa sanctuaries as an Important Bird Area (IBA IN344), with Blyth's tragopan identified as a vulnerable species of the area.

This area is extremely important for the continued well-being of the Asian elephant. Elephants regularly move up from the Assam plains to the Eaglenest ridge at 3250 m in summer, perhaps the highest altitude that elephants reach in India. Extensive clearing of forests through illegal encroachments in Assam adjacent to Eaglenest has exacerbated elephant-human conflict in the plains; it has also meant that elephants now have to stay longer in the Eaglenest area and may lead to depletion of their food resource by exceeding the rate of regeneration.

== External sources ==
- Snakes of Eaglenest Wildlife Sanctuary - Photo Gallery
- Pictures from Eaglenest Wildlife Sanctuary - Wildlife Photographs
