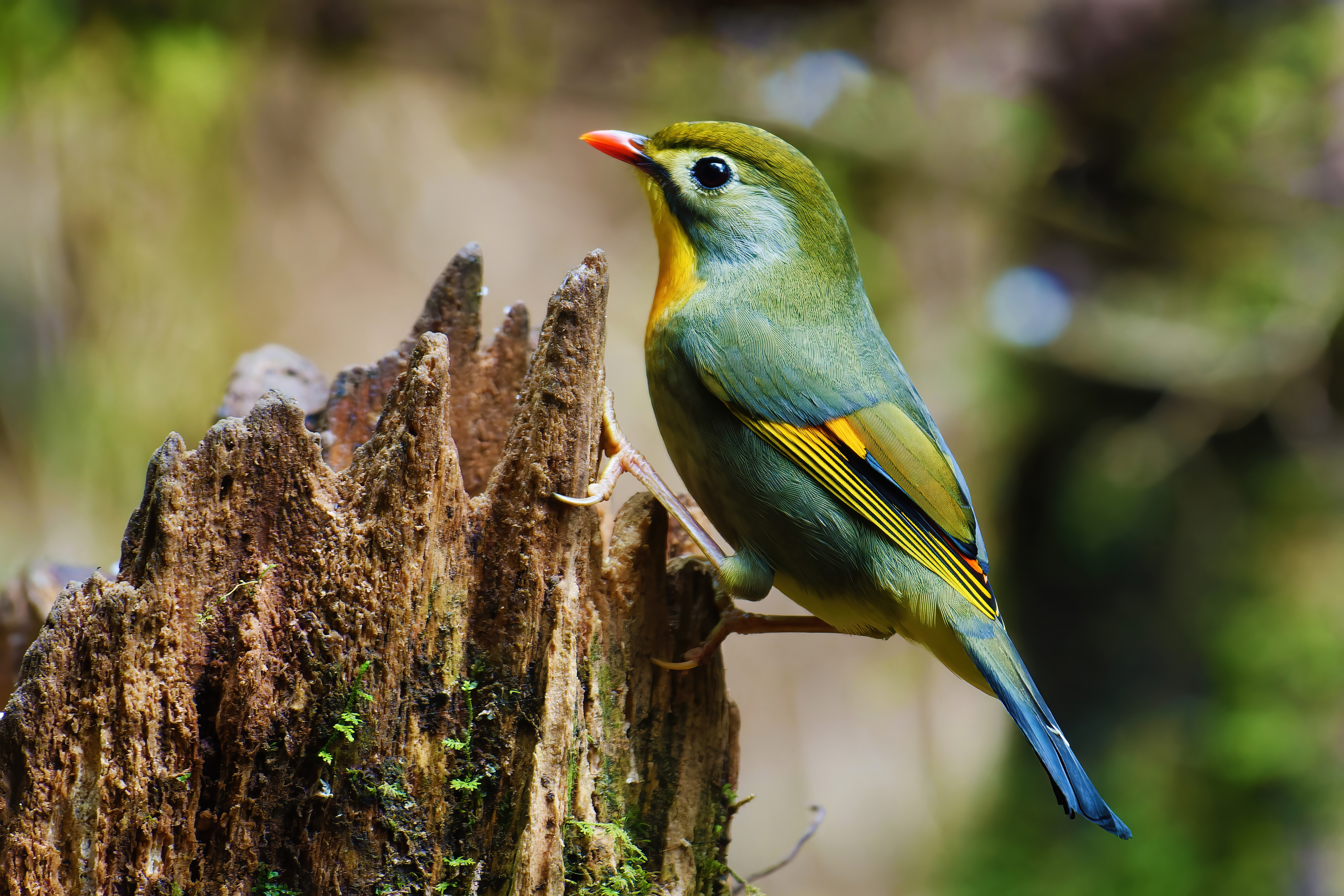
- Red-billed leiothrix Leiothrix lutea

Scientific classification
- Kingdom: Animalia
- Phylum: Chordata
- Class: Aves
- Order: Passeriformes
- Family: Leiothrichidae
- Genus: Leiothrix; Swainson, 1832

Type species
- Parus furcatus Temminck, 1824, = Sylvia lutea Scopoli, 1786

Species
- Leiothrix argentauris; Leiothrix lutea

= Leiothrix (bird) =

Genus of birds

Leiothrix is a genus of passerine birds in the family Leiothrichidae. They belong to a clade also containing at least the liocichlas, barwings, minlas and sibias. The sibias are possibly their closest living relatives.

== Taxonomy ==
The genus Leiothrix was introduced in 1832 by the English naturalist William Swainson with the red-billed leiothrix as the type species. The genus name combines the Ancient Greek leios meaning "smooth" and thrix meaning "hair".

The genus contains two species:

Genus Leiothrix – Swainson, 1832 – two species
Common name	Scientific name and subspecies	Range	Size and ecology	IUCN status and estimated population
Red-billed leiothrix	Leiothrix lutea (Scopoli, 1786) Five subspecies: L. l. kumaiensis Whistler, 1943; L. l. calipyga (Hodgson, 1837); L. l. yunnanensis Rothschild, 1921; L. l. kwangtungensis Stresemann, 1923; L. l. lutea (Scopoli, 1786)	China, and the Himalaya in northern India, Bhutan, Nepal, and parts of Tibet.	Size: 14–15 cm Habitat: Thick shrubs and woodland Diet: Insects, fruit, seeds	LC
Silver-eared mesia	Leiothrix argentauris (Hodgson, 1837) Nine subspecies: L. argentauris argentauris (Hodgson, 1837); L. argentauris aureigularis (Koelz, WN, 1953); L. argentauris vernayi (Mayr, E; Greenway, JC, 1938); L. argentauris galbana (Mayr & Greenway, 1938); L. argentauris ricketti (La Touche, 1923); L. argentauris cunhaci (Robinson & Kloss, 1919); L. argentauris tahanensis (Yen Kwokyung, 1934); L. argentauris rookmakeri (Junge, 1948); L. argentauris laurinae (Salvadori, 1879)	Southeast Asia, from Nepal east to southwestern China and south to Sumatra.	Size: 15–17 cm Habitat: Thick shrubs and woodland Diet: Insects, fruit, seeds	LC

Some authors have split silver-eared mesia into two species, L. argentauris in mainland Asia, and Sumatram mesia L. laurinae (with rookmakeri as a subspecies of it) on Sumatra, but this has not been followed by either the IOC World Bird List or the AviList.

Because of their plumage and song, they are frequently kept as cagebirds..
