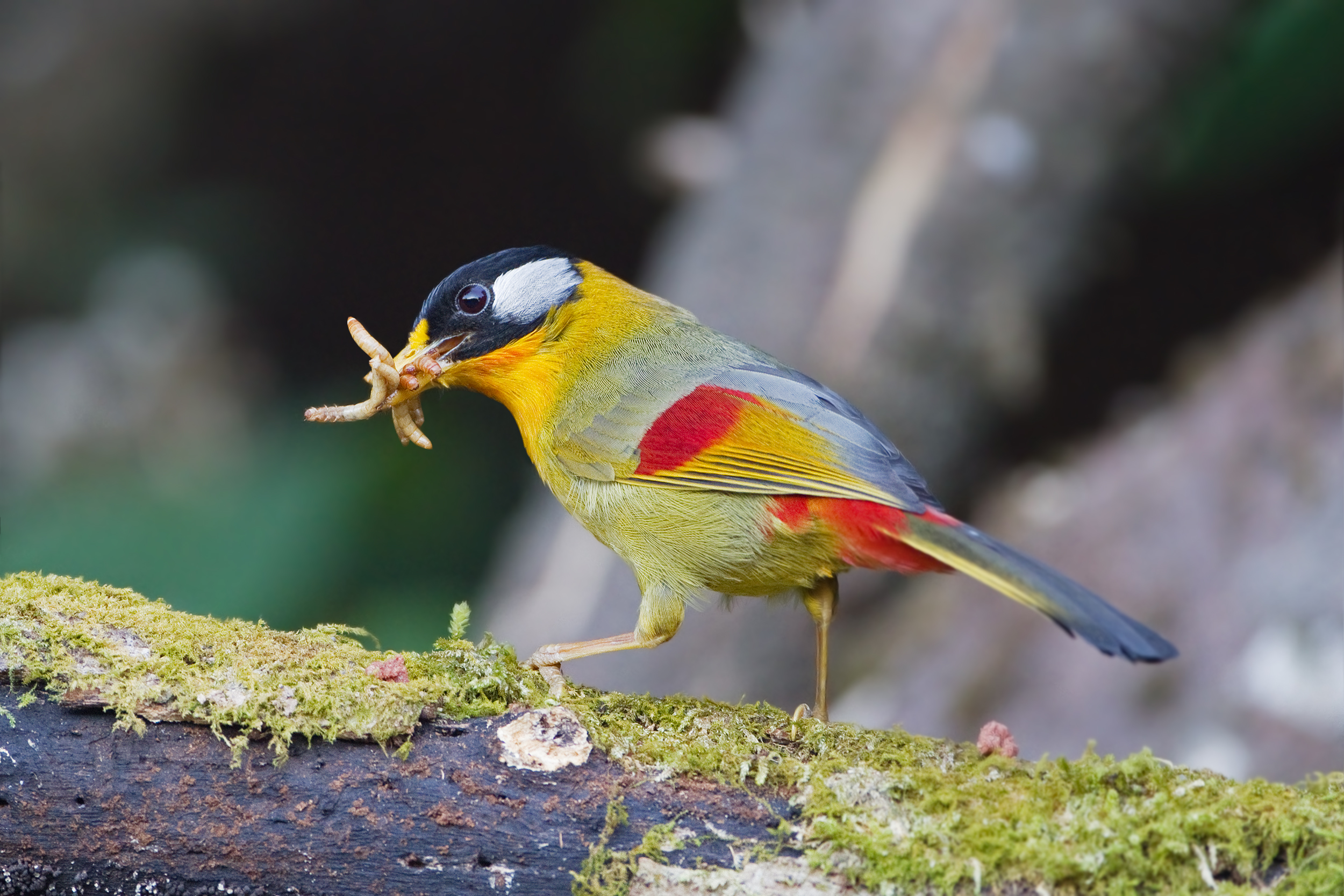
- male (red-orange rump)
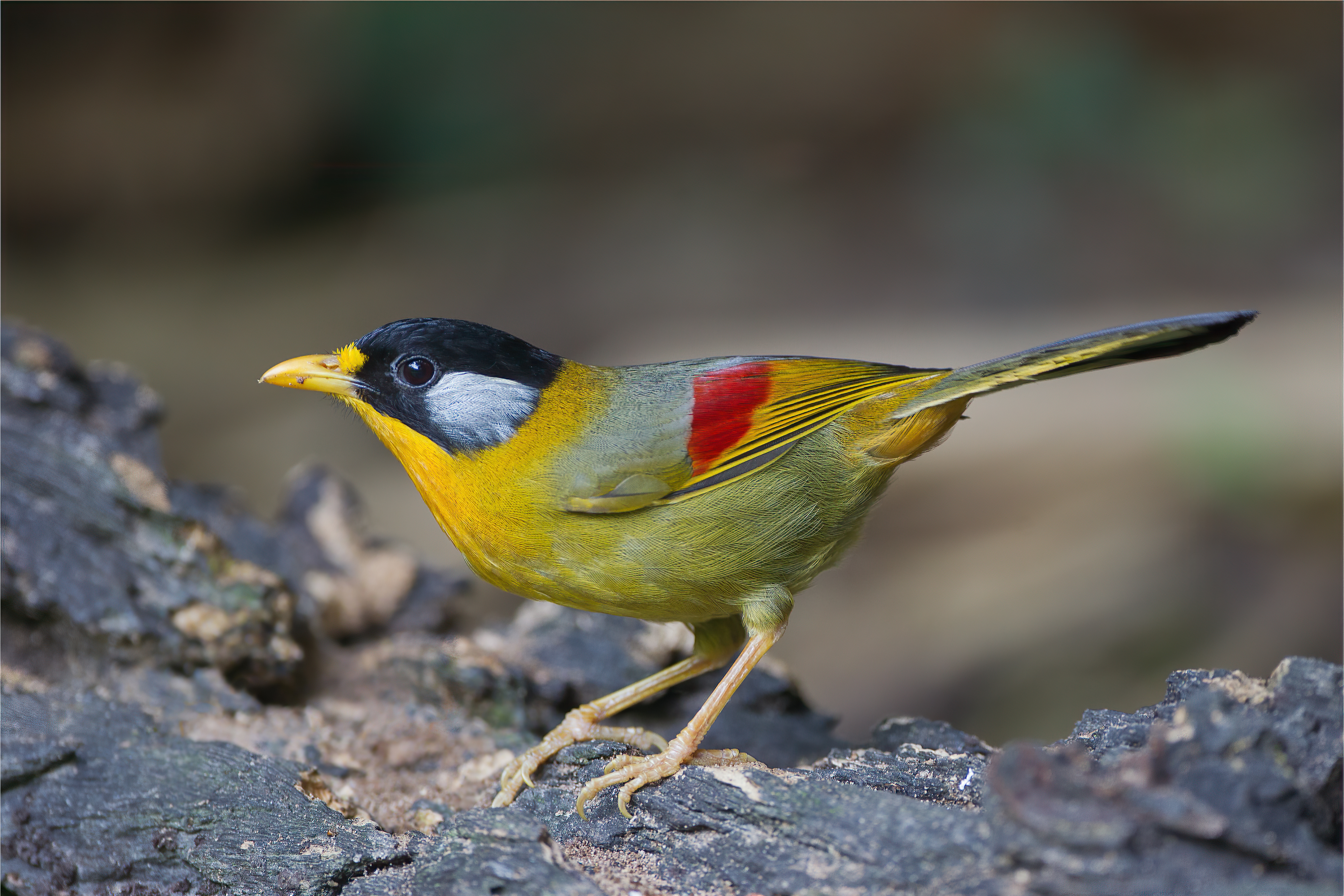
- female (yellow rump)

Conservation status
- Least Concern (IUCN 3.1)
- CITES Appendix II

Scientific classification
- Kingdom: Animalia
- Phylum: Chordata
- Class: Aves
- Order: Passeriformes
- Family: Leiothrichidae
- Genus: Leiothrix
- Species: L. argentauris

Binomial name
- Leiothrix argentauris (Hodgson, 1837)

Synonyms
- Mesia argentauris

= Silver-eared mesia =

Species of bird

The silver-eared mesia (Leiothrix argentauris) is a species of bird from South East Asia.

== Taxonomy and distribution ==
The species was once placed in the large Old World babbler family Timaliidae, but that family has recently been split with this species being placed with the laughingthrushes in the new family Leiothrichidae.

The species is sometimes placed in its own genus Mesia, or in the genus Leiothrix with the red-billed leiothrix. There are seven described subspecies, with considerable variation in plumage between them. Further research is needed to establish if this represents a single species or not.

The subspecies and their distributions are:

- M argentauris argentauris (Hodgson, 1837) - Northern and eastern India, Bhutan, northern Burma and southern China.
- M argentauris galbana (Mayr & Greenway, 1938) - Southern Burma and northern Thailand
- M argentauris ricketti (La Touche, 1923) - China (Yunnan, Guixhou & Guangxi), and northern Laos and Vietnam.
- M argentauris cunhaci (Robinson & Kloss, 1919) - Southern Laos & Vietnam, Cambodia.
- M argentauris tahanensis (Yen Kwokyung, 1934) - Southern Thailand and Peninsular Malaysia.
- M argentauris rookmakeri (Junge, 1948) - Northern Sumatra.
- M argentauris laurinae (Salvadori, 1879) - Southern Sumatra.

The species is generally resident although it has been reported as a winter migrant to Nameri National Park in Assam, India, which implies that the species may be an altitudinal migrant. The species has been introduced to Hong Kong from captive stock derived from caged birds.

== Diet ==
The diet of the silver-eared mesia is dominated by insects and their larvae, as well as fruit and to a lesser extent seeds. A study of the diet of feral birds in Hong Kong found that 87% of the faecal samples studied had the remains of insects in them, and 97% had the remains of fruit. The species will often associate in large groups of up to thirty individuals while foraging, and even forms groups during the breeding season. They will also join large flocks of other species in the forest, known as waves, which include other species of babblers. They generally feed closer to the ground, but may go as high as 5 metres up into the canopy.

== Breeding ==
The silver-eared mesia is a seasonal breeder, with the season lasting from November to August, although the season starts later, in April, in the northern part of its range. Both the male and female are involved in building the nest, a deep cup of bamboo and other dead leaves lined with rootlets and fern fibres. The nest takes about four days to construct and is placed near ground level or up to 2m up in a bush. Underlying its relationship with the red-billed leiothrix the nest is said to be indistinguishable from the one of that species.

The eggs of silver-eared mesia are white with light but rich madder-brown spots. Between two and five eggs are laid in a typical clutch, with four being the typical number in India but two or three more common in Malaysia. Both parents incubate the eggs, with (at least in captivity) the female incubating the eggs during the night. The eggs are incubated for 13 to 14 days after the laying of the first egg. Both parents feed the chicks, which fledge after 12 days, and parental care lasts for a further 22 days after fledging.

== Gallery ==
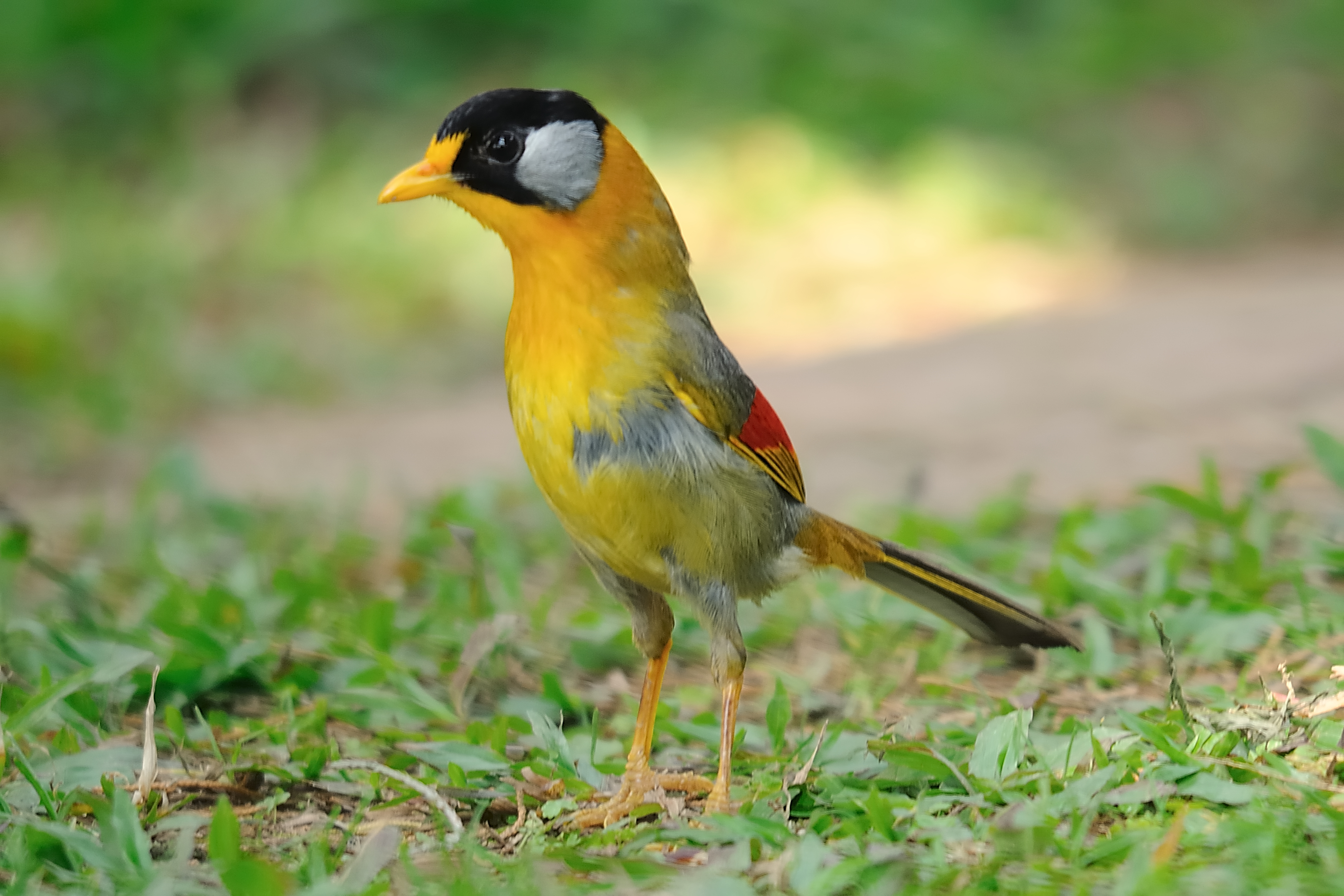
Male silver-eared mesia

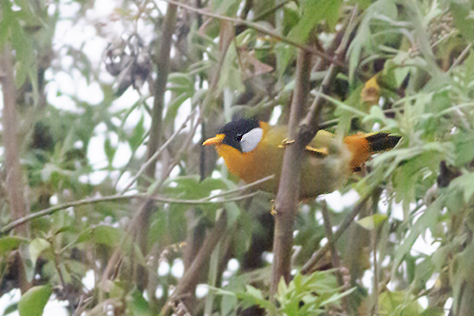
Subspecies M.a.argentauris from Neora Valley National Park, India

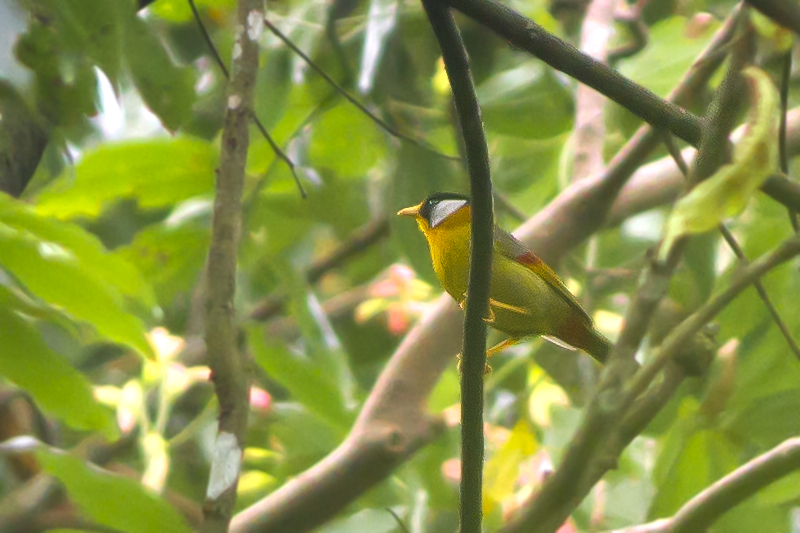
Subspecies M.a.argentauris from Mahananda Wildlife Sanctuary, West Bengal, India

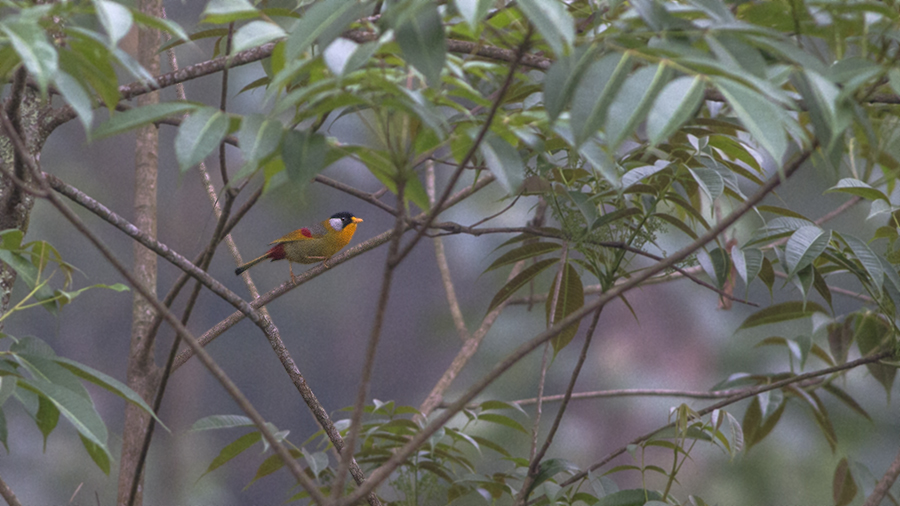
From Neora Valley National Park, West Bengal, India
