= Japalura sagittifera =

Scientific classification
- Kingdom: Animalia
- Phylum: Chordata
- Class: Reptilia
- Order: Squamata
- Suborder: Iguania
- Family: Agamidae
- Genus: Japalura
- Species: J. sagittifera

Binomial name
- Japalura sagittifera Smith, 1940

Species of lizard

Japalura sagittifera, the Burmese japalure, is a species of agamid lizard. It is endemic to Myanmar.
