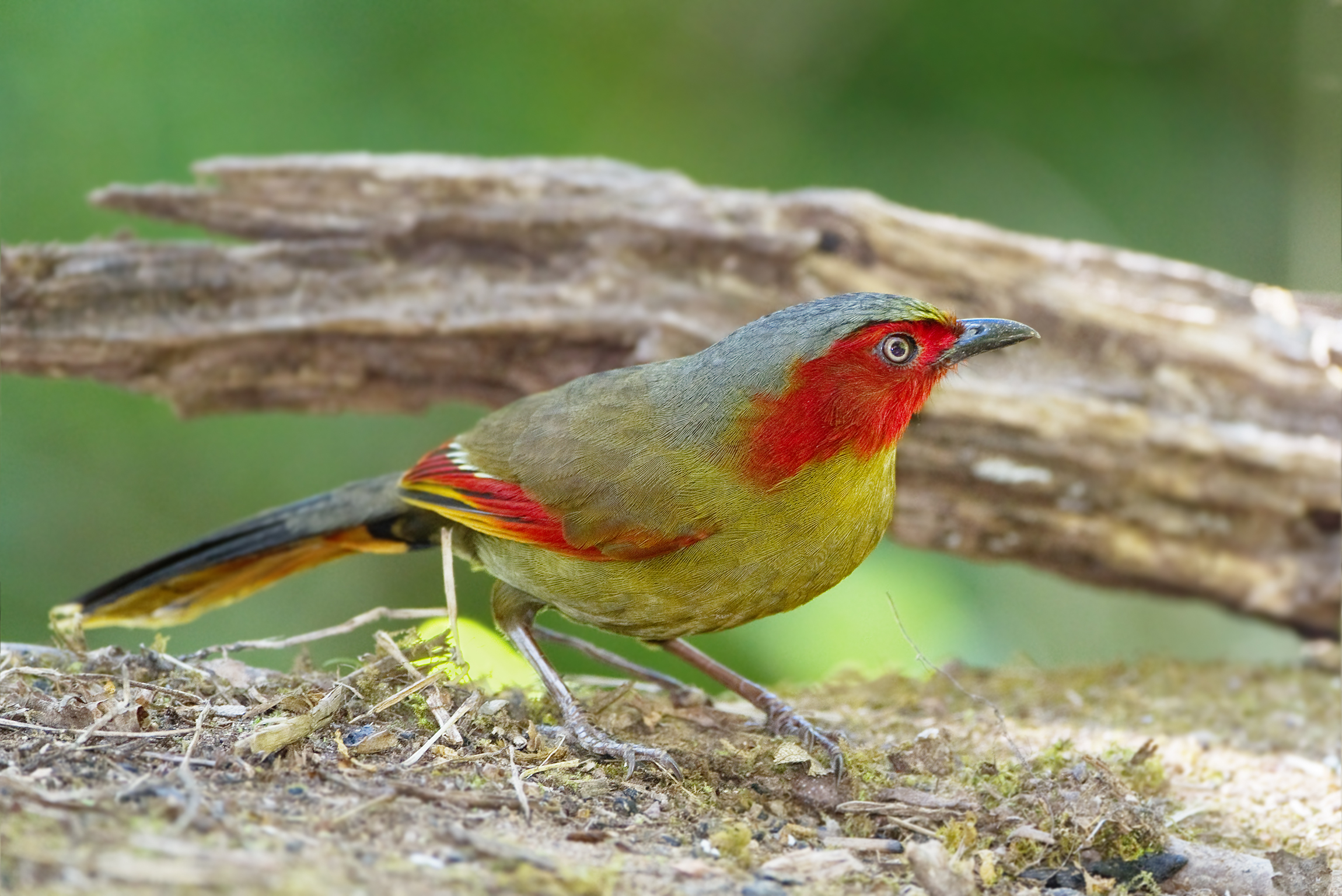

Conservation status
- Least Concern (IUCN 3.1)

Scientific classification
- Kingdom: Animalia
- Phylum: Chordata
- Class: Aves
- Order: Passeriformes
- Family: Leiothrichidae
- Genus: Liocichla
- Species: L. ripponi

Binomial name
- Liocichla ripponi (Oates, 1900)

Synonyms
- Liocichla phoenicea ripponi

= Scarlet-faced liocichla =

Species of bird

The scarlet-faced liocichla (Liocichla ripponi) is a bird in the family Leiothrichidae. The species was recently reclassified as separate from the red-faced liocichla, although some taxonomists consider it to be conspecific. It is found in Myanmar, Thailand, Vietnam, and southern China.
