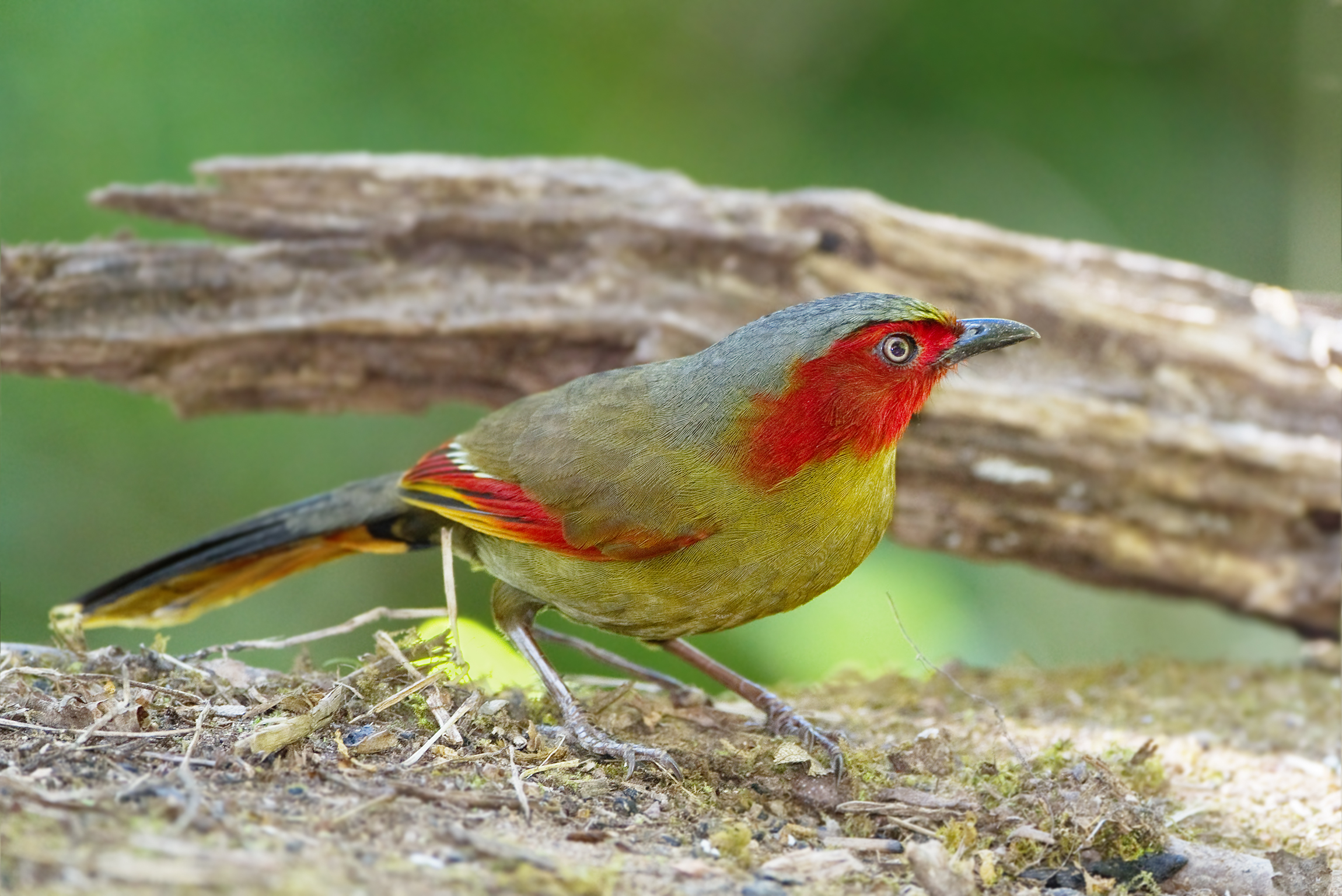
- Scarlet-faced liocichla (Liocichla ripponi)

Scientific classification
- Kingdom: Animalia
- Phylum: Chordata
- Class: Aves
- Order: Passeriformes
- Family: Leiothrichidae
- Genus: Liocichla; R. Swinhoe, 1877

Type species
- Liocichla steerii Swinhoe, 1877

Species
- See text

= Liocichla =

Genus of birds

The liocichlas are a group of birds in the genus of the same name, Liocichla, from the family Leiothrichidae. They are found in Asia from India to China. They belong to a clade also containing at least the Leiothrix, the barwings, the minlas and the sibias. The Liocichla radiation likely began sometime between the mid-Miocene and the Miocene-Pliocene boundary.

== Taxonomy ==
L. steerii, endemic to the island of Taiwan, is the sister species to all other species in the genus. Molecular evidence also indicates that an L. phoenicea/L. ripponi clade is sister to an L. bugunorum/L. omeiensis clade, and suggests a complex biogeographic history in the group.

- L. steerii
- - - L. omeiensis
    - L. bugunorum
  - - L. phoenicea
    - L. ripponi

Phylogeny of the genus.

=== Species ===
The genus contains five species:

| Image | Scientific name | Common name | Distribution |
|---|---|---|---|
| | Liocichla phoenicea | Red-faced liocichla | Bangladesh, Bhutan, Myanmar, Northeast India, Nepal and western Yunnan. |
| | Liocichla ripponi | Scarlet-faced liocichla | Myanmar, Thailand, Vietnam, and southern China. |
| | Liocichla omeiensis | Emei Shan liocichla | Sichuan, China. |
| | Liocichla bugunorum | Bugun liocichla | Arunachal Pradesh, India |
| | Liocichla steerii | Steere's liocichla | Taiwan. |

== See also ==
- Bird species new to science described in the 2000s
