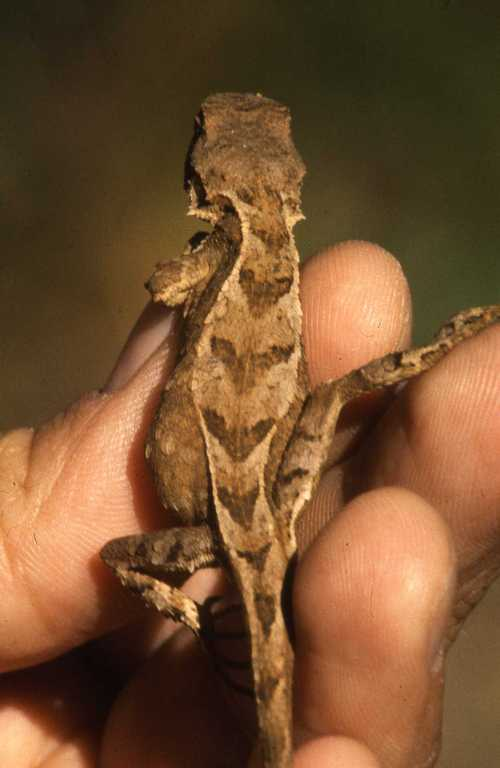

Scientific classification
- Kingdom: Animalia
- Phylum: Chordata
- Class: Reptilia
- Order: Squamata
- Suborder: Iguania
- Family: Agamidae
- Genus: Japalura
- Species: J. major

Binomial name
- Japalura major (Jerdon, 1870)

Synonyms
- Oreocalotes major Jerdon, 1870

= Japalura major =

Species of lizard

Japalura major (large mountain lizard or greater forest agama) is an agamid lizard found in northern India and Nepal. It lives at elevations up to 2,600 metres (8,500 ft).
