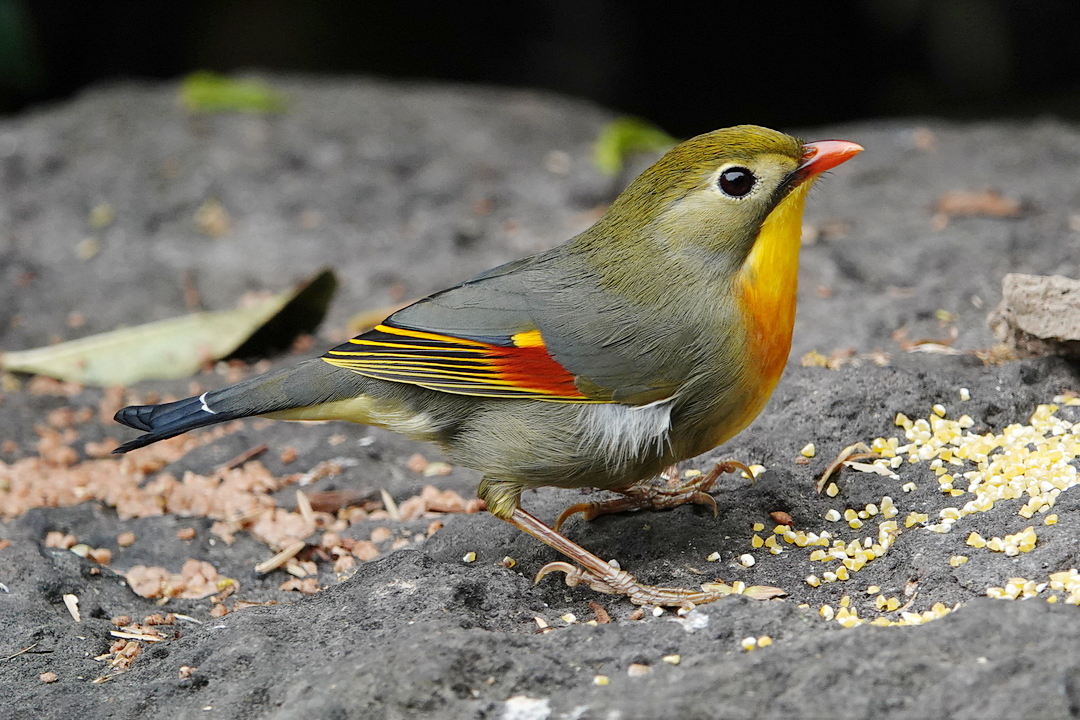
- L. l. lutea in Guizhou, China
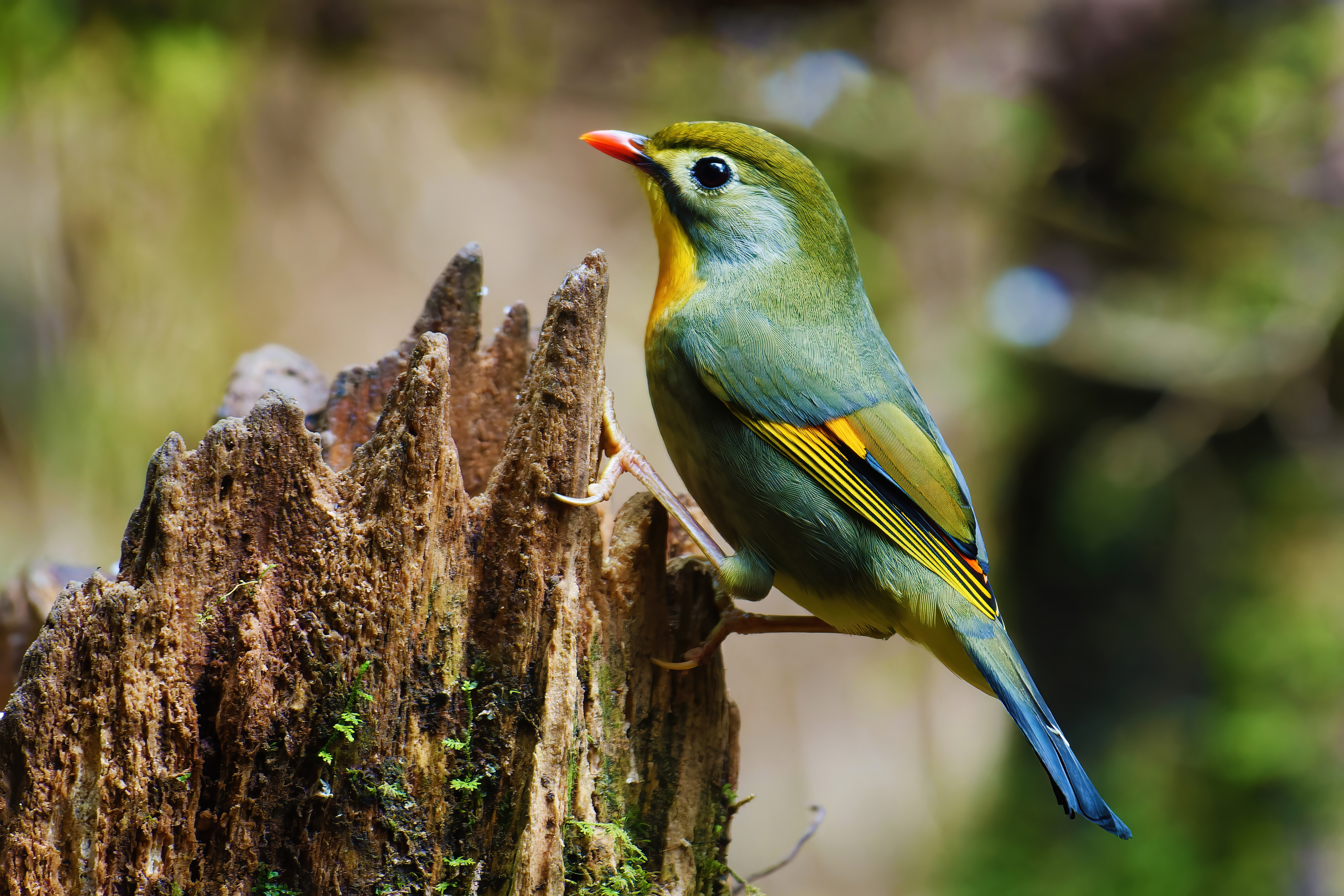
- L. l. calipyga near Darjeeling, India

Conservation status
- Least Concern (IUCN 3.1)
- CITES Appendix II

Scientific classification
- Kingdom: Animalia
- Phylum: Chordata
- Class: Aves
- Order: Passeriformes
- Family: Leiothrichidae
- Genus: Leiothrix
- Species: L. lutea

Binomial name
- Leiothrix lutea (Scopoli, 1786)

= Red-billed leiothrix =

Species of bird

The red-billed leiothrix (Leiothrix lutea) is a member of the family Leiothrichidae, native to southern China and the Himalayas. Adults have bright red bills and a yellowish-white ring around their eyes. Their backs are dull olive green, and they have a bright yellow-orange throat with a yellow chin; females are somewhat duller than males, and juveniles have black bills. It has also been introduced in various parts of the world, with small populations of escapees having existed in Japan since the 1980s. It has become a common cagebird and amongst aviculturists it goes by various names, including Pekin robin, Pekin nightingale, Japanese nightingale, and Japanese (hill) robin, these all being misnomers as it is not native to Japan (although it has been introduced and naturalised there), nor is it a robin or a nightingale.

== Taxonomy ==
The red-billed leiothrix was formally described in 1786 by the Austrian naturalist Giovanni Antonio Scopoli under the binomial name Sylvia lutea. Scopoli based his account on "La mésange de Nanguin" that had been described and illustrated in 1782 by the French naturalist Pierre Sonnerat in the second volume of his book Voyage aux Indes orientales et à la Chine. The species is now placed together with the silver-eared mesia in the genus Leiothrix that was introduced in 1832 by the English naturalist William Swainson. The genus name combines the Ancient Greek leios meaning "smooth" and thrix meaning "hair". The specific epithet lutea is from Latin luteus meaning "saffron-yellow". Scopoli specified the type location as China but this was subsequently restricted to the mountainous regions of the Chinese province of Anhui.

Five subspecies are recognised:

- L. l. kumaiensis Whistler, 1943 – northwest Himalayas
- L. l. calipyga (Hodgson, 1837) – central Himalayas to northwest Myanmar
- L. l. yunnanensis Rothschild, 1921 – northeast Myanmar and south China
- L. l. kwangtungensis Stresemann, 1923 – southeast China and north Vietnam
- L. l. lutea (Scopoli, 1786) – south-central, east China

== Description ==
The leiothrix is 14–15.5 cm (5.5–6.1 in) long, generally olive green, and has a yellow throat with orange shading on the breast. It also has a yellowish-white ring around the eye that extends to the beak. The edges of the wing feathers are brightly coloured with yellow, orange, red and black and the forked tail is olive brown and blackish at the tip. The cheeks and side of the neck are a bluish grey colour. The eye is brown, the bill red, and the legs and feet pinkish. The sexes are similar, though the females are slightly smaller and duller, with less red on the wing; juveniles even duller. The subspecies differ in the extent and intensity of the colours on the back and wings. It is very active and an excellent singer but is often secretive and difficult to see.

== Distribution and habitat ==
The red-billed leiothrix is native throughout southern and eastern China, and west along the Himalaya in northern India, Bhutan, Nepal, Burma and parts of Tibet. It is a bird of the forests, found in every type of jungle though it prefers pine forests with dense bushes and undergrowth. It occurs from sea level to 3,400 metres (11,200 ft) altitude. It is generally resident, but in Bhutan, some altitudinal migration is recorded, with birds breeding at 1,800–3,400 m (5,900–11,200 ft) in summer, and descending to 600–2,800 m (2,000–9,200 ft) in winter.

=== As an invasive species ===
In Japan, naturalised populations of what is probably the nominate subspecies have been recorded since the 1980s and it has become established in central and southwestern Japan, where it occurs in forests of Abies and Tsuga with a dense understorey of bamboo. It is also established on the Mascarene island of Réunion. The species was introduced to the Hawaiian Islands in 1918 and spread to all the forested islands except Lanai. Its population on Oahu crashed in the 1960s and it disappeared from Kauai, but is now common and increasing on Oahu. Populations derived from escaped cagebirds have become established in France, where it now occurs in several areas; in Spain where it is increasing and spreading from the Collserola Park; and in Portugal. The species has also become established in Italy where three major populations can be identified (Tuscany and Liguria, Latium, Colli Euganei) and there are several areas at high risk of invasion. Birds have also escaped in Great Britain, but permanent establishment is not thought to be successful, although a cluster of sightings in 2020–2022 in southern England suggests that some colonies may have been established. It was also released in Western Australia but it failed to become established.

== Behaviour and ecology ==
The presence of the avian malaria parasite has been found in the blood of this species.

=== Diet ===
It eats invertebrates including various species of insects (including Diptera, Lepidoptera, Hymenoptera), spiders, millipedes, and molluscs; and fruit such as strawberries, ripened papaya, guava, and seeds, including grass seeds. Its food is usually gathered from foliage and dead wood and it usually searches for food in lower strata of vegetation below 3 m (9.8 ft) above ground level, but also flycatches for flying insects and picks insects off foliage higher up in trees.

=== Breeding ===
The leiothrix can usually be found in a group of about 10–30 birds during the non-breeding season; however, during the breeding season the birds break off into pairs and become territorial. These birds have a song which consists of short powerful notes that are repeated continuously throughout the year but it is more persistent during the breeding season. This period usually lasts from early April until September and they are usually found around well watered areas. The males sing long complex songs with a wide array of syllables to attempt to attract the female.

The leiothrix is an open cup nester. The nests of the red-billed leiothrix are composed of dry leaves, moss and lichen; however, they are not well hidden because concealment is not really a primary factor when determining a nest site. Nests are found between April and June and are placed within 3 m (9.8 ft) of the ground. Dense vegetation provides the shrub nesting species protection against predators.

The eggs are laid in clutches of three to five eggs with an average of 3.4. They are broad and blunt in shape with some gloss on the outside and they also have a pale blue colour and red like brown spots that encircle the larger end of the eggs. The newly hatched birds have bright red skin and a rich orange red gape.

== Gallery ==
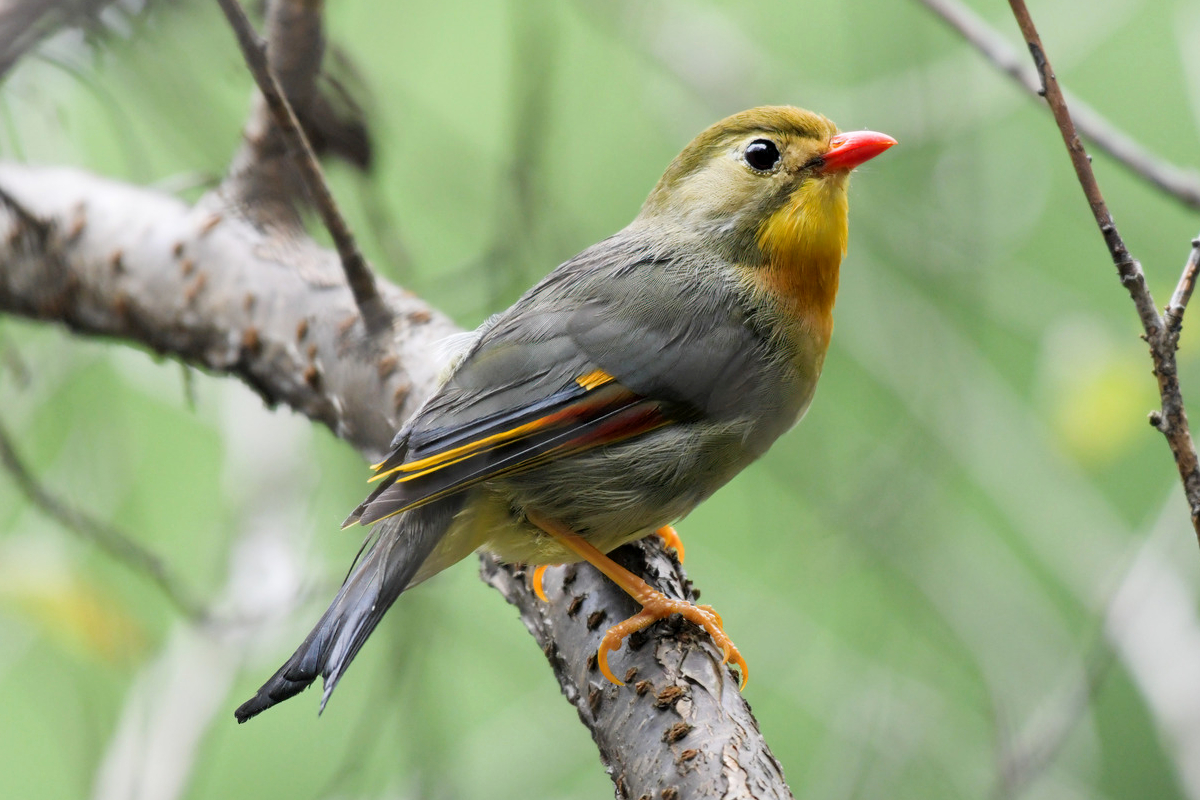
L. l. lutea in Hangzhou, Zhejiang, China

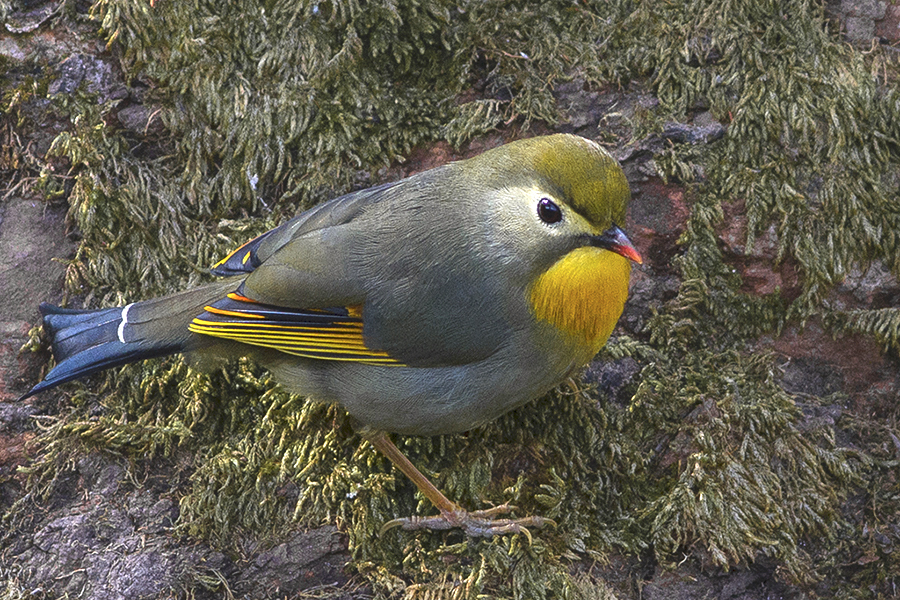
L. l. kumaiensis at Nainital, Uttarakhand, India

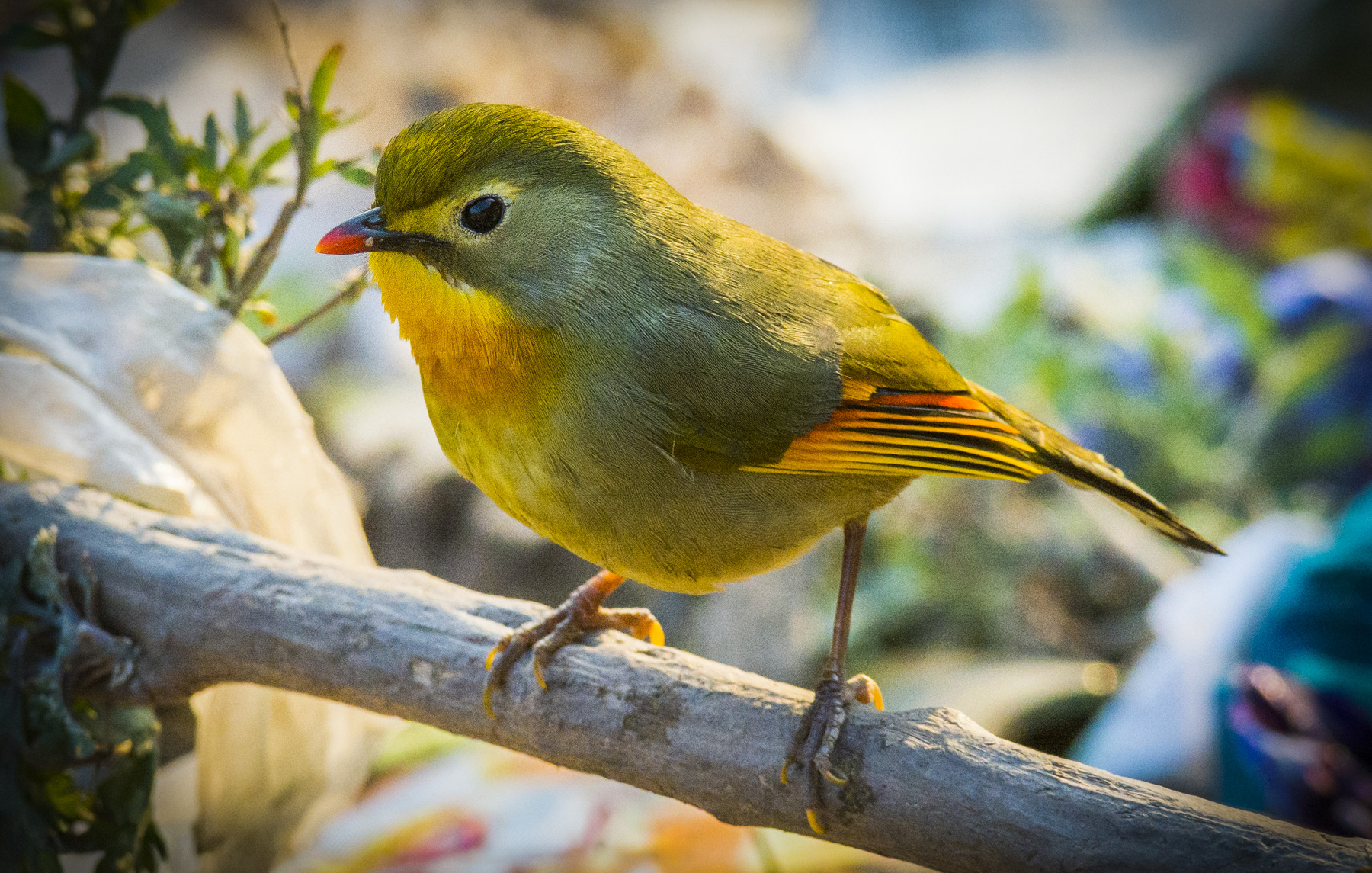
L. l. kumaiensis at Chakkimorh, Himachal Pradesh, India

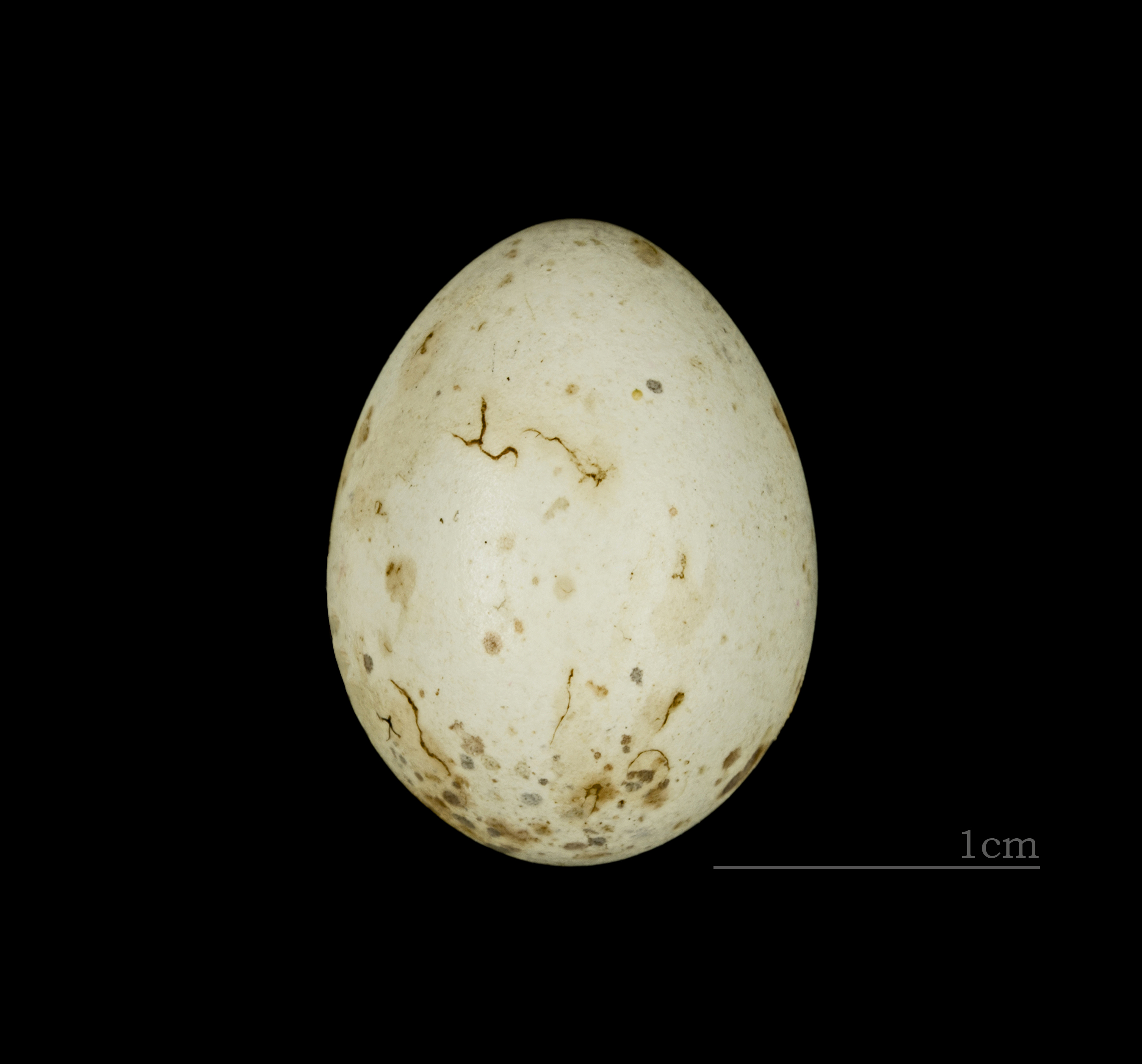
Egg of L. l. calipyga MHNT
