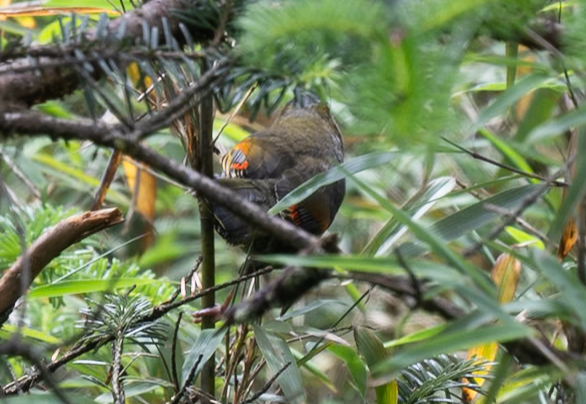

Conservation status
- Vulnerable (IUCN 3.1)
- CITES Appendix II

Scientific classification
- Kingdom: Animalia
- Phylum: Chordata
- Class: Aves
- Order: Passeriformes
- Family: Leiothrichidae
- Genus: Liocichla
- Species: L. omeiensis

Binomial name
- Liocichla omeiensis Riley, 1926

= Emei Shan liocichla =

Species of bird

The Emei Shan liocichla (Liocichla omeiensis), also known as the Omei Shan or grey-faced liocichla, is a passerine bird in the family Leiothrichidae. It is closely related to the Bugun liocichla, a species only described in 2006, and which it closely resembles.

== Habitat ==
The species is endemic to forests in mountain ranges in Southern Sichuan, China. It is an altitudinal migrant, spending the summer months above 1000 m and moving below 600m in the winter. It is often found in thick bamboo and deep scrub forests.

== Description ==
The Emei Shan liocichla is an olive-grey coloured bird with red wing patches. The plumage on the face is grey with a slight red ring on each side of the face.

== Diet ==
The species feeds in the undergrowth of semi-tropical rainforest. It is an herbivore.

== Threats ==
The Emei Shan liocichla is considered vulnerable by the IUCN. It is threatened by habitat loss through logging and conversion to agriculture. Some populations are protected inside reserves, such as the Emei Shan Protected Scenic Site.

== Vocalization ==
Individual males have very distinct songs, and can be identified by their vocalizations. They whistle loudly and in complex patterns during breeding seasons to maintain their territories. Females do not vocalize.

== Breeding ==
Its nesting success has decreased as a result of habitat loss. After disturbances, Emei Shan liocichlas tend to place their nests higher (in taller plants or on higher parts of the plants), or in thornier trees, presumably to protect against further disturbances.
