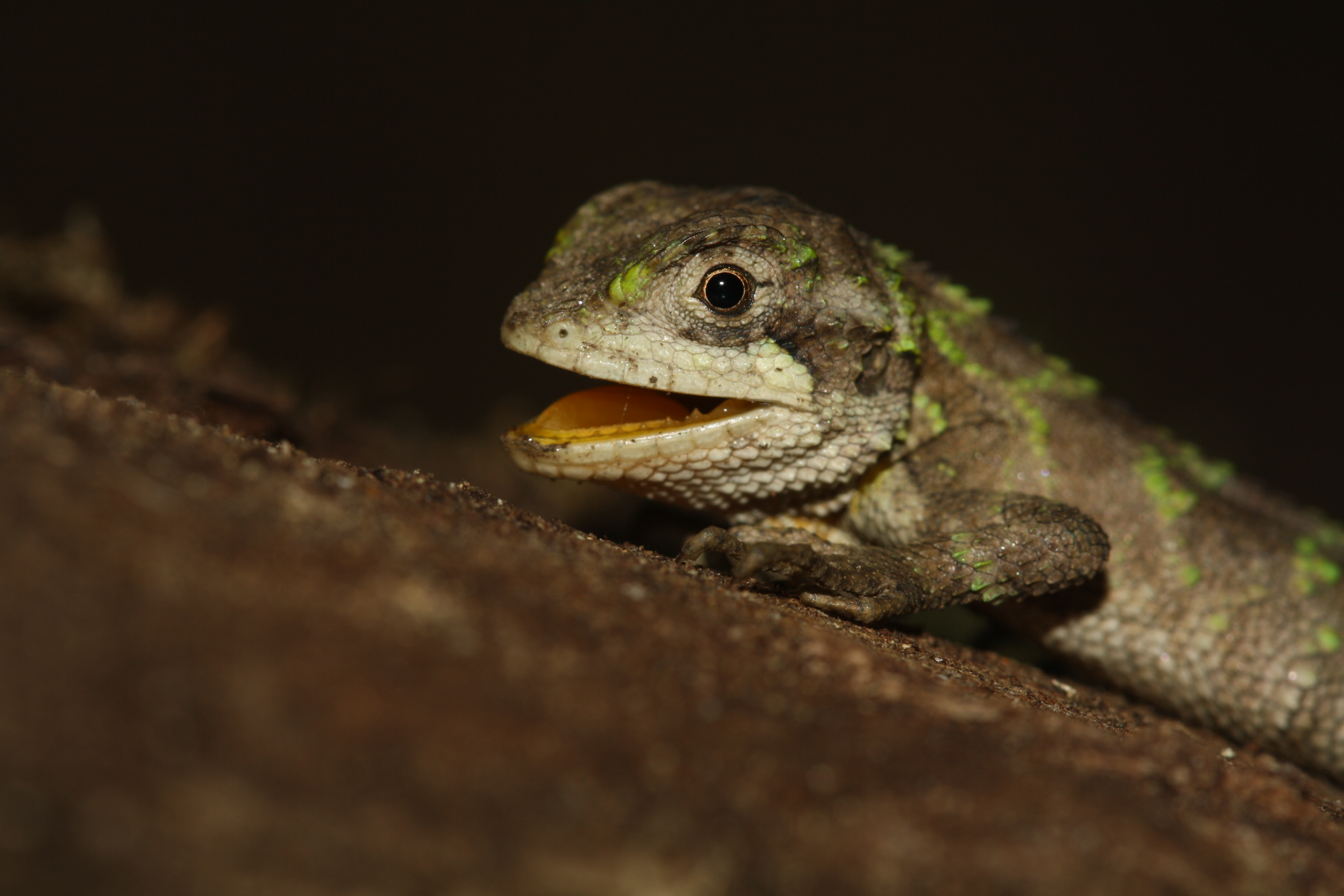

Conservation status
- Least Concern (IUCN 3.1)

Scientific classification
- Kingdom: Animalia
- Phylum: Chordata
- Class: Reptilia
- Order: Squamata
- Suborder: Iguania
- Family: Agamidae
- Genus: Japalura
- Species: J. austeniana

Binomial name
- Japalura austeniana (Annandale, 1908)

Synonyms
- Salea austeniana Annandale, 1908; Mictopholis austeniana — M.A. Smith, 1935; Pseudocalotes austeniana — Mahony, 2010; Mictopholis austeniana — Lenz, 2012

= Japalura austeniana =

Species of lizard

Japalura austeniana, also known commonly as the Abor Hills agama or Annandale's dragon, is a rare species of lizard in the family Agamidae. The species is endemic to Asia.

== Etymology ==
The specific name, austeniana, is in honor of English topographer Henry Haversham Godwin-Austen.

== Geographic range ==
J. austeniana is found in Bhutan and India (Assam, Arunachal Pradesh).

Type locality: "Hills near Harmatti, Assam" (= Dafla Hills, Assam, fide M.A. Smith 1935).

== Rediscovery ==
This species, J. austeniana, was previously known only from its holotype, but was rediscovered in 2006 at Eaglenest Wildlife Sanctuary in Arunachal Pradesh.

== Description ==
The holotype of J. austeniana, a female, has a snout-to-vent length (SVL) of 9 cm (3.5 in). The tail is very long, 23 cm (9.1 in).

== Reproduction ==
J. austeniana is oviparous.
