= Japalura tricarinata =

Conservation status
- Least Concern (IUCN 3.1)

Scientific classification
- Kingdom: Animalia
- Phylum: Chordata
- Class: Reptilia
- Order: Squamata
- Suborder: Iguania
- Family: Agamidae
- Genus: Japalura
- Species: J. tricarinata

Binomial name
- Japalura tricarinata (Blyth, 1853)
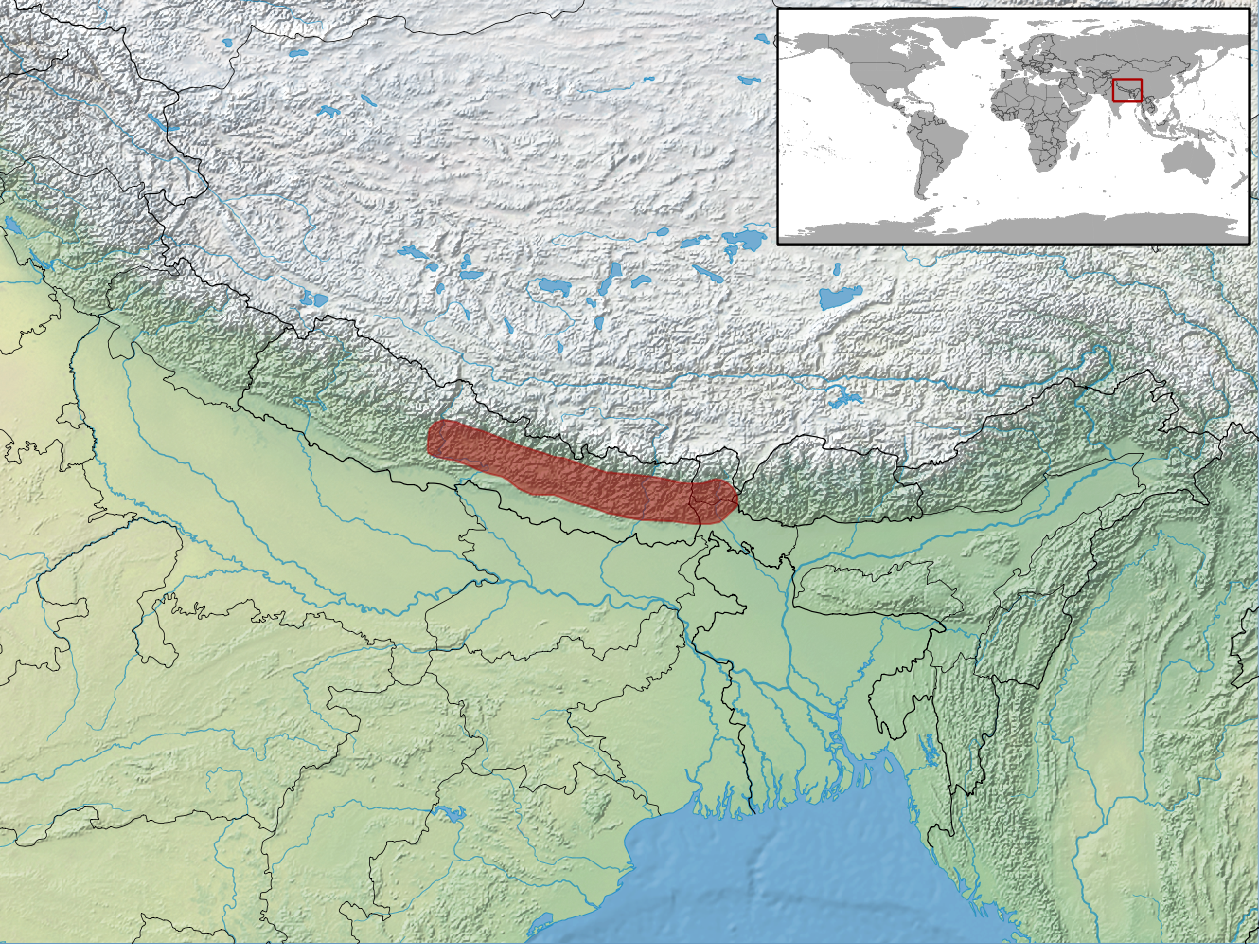

Synonyms
- Calotes tricarinatus Blyth, 1853; Tiaris elliotti Günther, 1860; Oriotiaris elliotti — Günther, 1864; Oreotiaris tricarinata — Anderson, 1871; Acanthosaura tricarinata — Boulenger, 1885; Japalura tricarinata — M.A. Smith, 1935

Species of lizard

Japalura tricarinata is a species of agamid lizard endemic to Asia.

== Common names ==
Common names for this species include three-keeled mountain lizard, cloud-forest japalure, Sikkimese mountain lizard, and three-keeled forest agama.

== Geographic range ==
J. tricarinata is found in India, Nepal, and Tibet (China).
