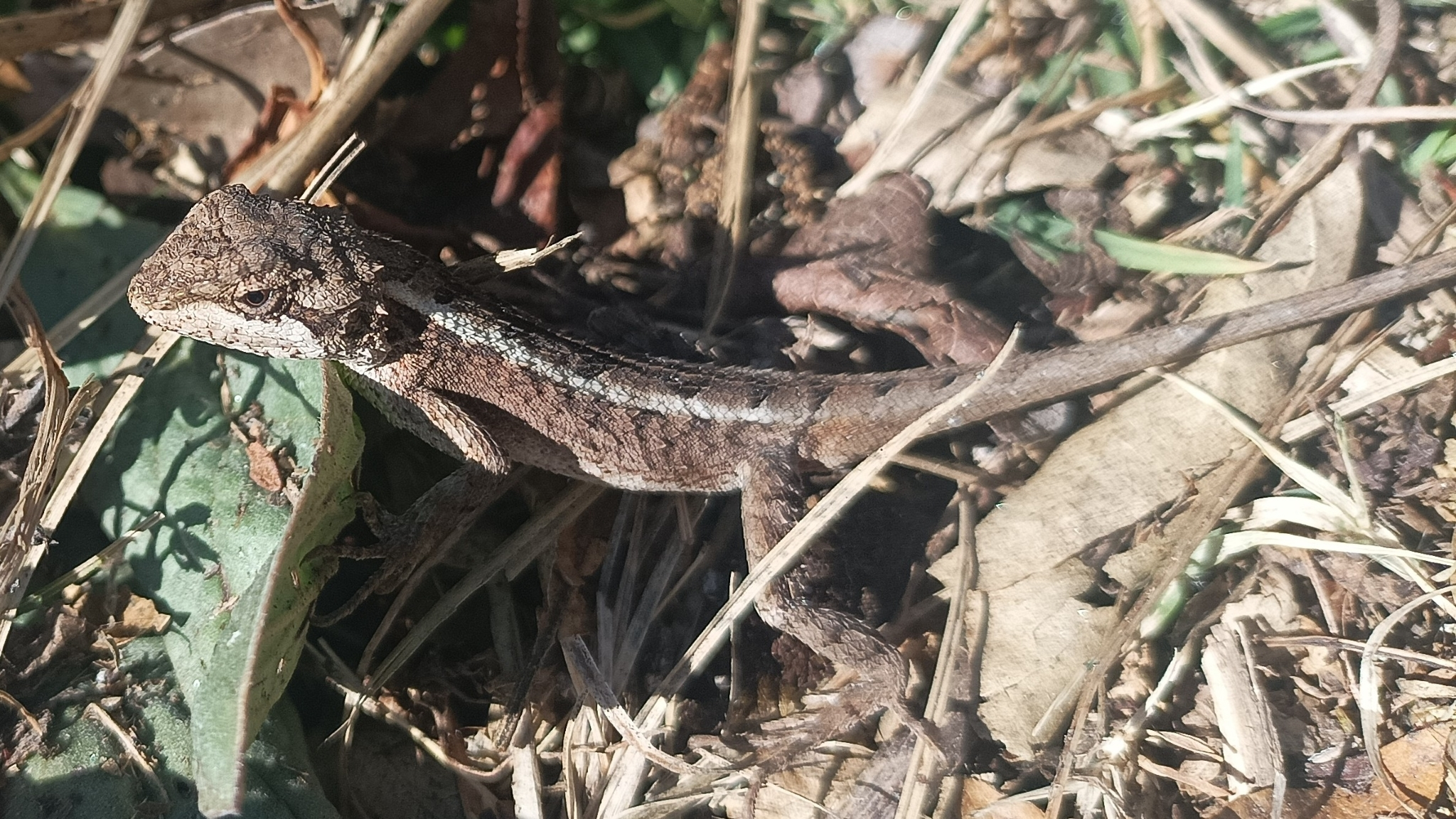

Scientific classification
- Kingdom: Animalia
- Phylum: Chordata
- Class: Reptilia
- Order: Squamata
- Suborder: Iguania
- Family: Agamidae
- Genus: Japalura
- Species: J. kumaonensis

Binomial name
- Japalura kumaonensis (Annandale, 1907)

Synonyms
- Acanthosaura kumaonensis Annandale, 1907; Acanthosaura major Annandale, 1914

= Japalura kumaonensis =

Species of lizard

Japalura kumaonensis (common names: Kumaon mountain lizard, Kumaon forest agama) is an agamid lizard found in northern India, Pakistan, Nepal, and Tibet (China). It was described based on specimens from Mussoorie and from Nainital in the Kumaon division, the latter reflected in the specific name kumaonensis.
