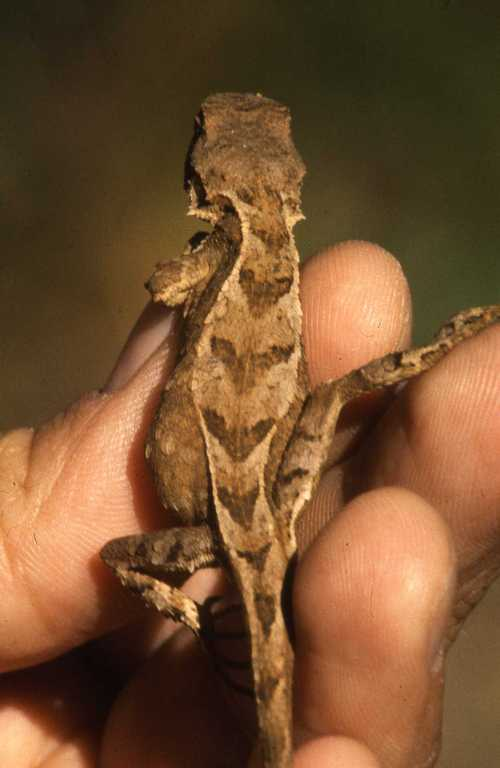
- Japalura major

Scientific classification
- Kingdom: Animalia
- Phylum: Chordata
- Class: Reptilia
- Order: Squamata
- Suborder: Iguania
- Family: Agamidae
- Subfamily: Draconinae
- Genus: Japalura; Gray, 1853

= Japalura =

Genus of lizards

Japalura is a genus of lizards in the family Agamidae. Species of Japalura are native to Pakistan, India, China, and Myanmar. Many species have been moved to the genus Diploderma.

== Species ==
The following eight species are recognized as being valid:

Image	Scientific name	Common name	Distribution
	Japalura andersoniana Annandale, 1905	Anderson's mountain lizard	southwestern China
	Japalura austeniana (Annandale, 1908)	Abor Hills agama	Bhutan and India (Assam, Arunachal Pradesh).
	Japalura dasi (Shah & Kästle, 2002)	Agaupani mountain lizard, Agaupani forest agama	Nepal.
	Japalura kumaonensis (Annandale, 1907)	Kumaon mountain lizard, Kumaon forest agama	northern India, Pakistan, Nepal, and Tibet (China)
	Japalura major (Jerdon, 1870)	large mountain lizard, greater forest agama	northern India and Nepal.
	Japalura sagittifera M.A. Smith, 1940	Burmese japalure	Myanmar.
	Japalura tricarinata (Blyth, 1853)	three-keeled mountain lizard, tricarinate forest agama	India, Nepal, and Tibet (China)
	Japalura variegata Gray, 1853	variegated mountain lizard, Himalayan dragon	northern India, Bhutan, and Nepal.

Nota bene: a binomial authority in parentheses indicates that the species was originally described in a genus other than Japalura.
