= Japalura dasi =

Conservation status
- Vulnerable (IUCN 3.1)

Scientific classification
- Kingdom: Animalia
- Phylum: Chordata
- Class: Reptilia
- Order: Squamata
- Suborder: Iguania
- Family: Agamidae
- Genus: Japalura
- Species: J. dasi

Binomial name
- Japalura dasi (Shah & Kästle, 2002)

Synonyms
- Oriotiaris dasi Shah & Kästle, 2002; Japalura dasi — Mahony, 2009

Species of lizard

Japalura dasi, also known commonly as the Agaupani mountain lizard or the Agaupani forest agama (Nepalese: Agaupani jangali chheparo or hariyo chheparo), is a species of lizard in the family Agamidae. The species is native to Nepal. It is listed as "Vulnerable" by the International Union for Conservation of Nature.

== Etymology ==
The specific name, dasi, is in honor of Indian herpetologist, Indraneil Das.

== Geographic range ==
J. dasi is endemic to the Bajhura District in Nepal.

== Habitat ==
The preferred natural habitat of J. dasi is shrubland, but it can also be found in cultivated habitats.

== Reproduction ==
J. dasi is oviparous.
