= Indraneil Das =

Indian biologist and herpetologist (born 1964)

- Born: December 18, 1964 (age 61); Kolkata, India
- Education: University of Calcutta; University of Bhopal; University of Oxford
- Known for: Rediscovery of several rare and thought-to-be-extinct species
- Scientific career
- Fields: Herpetology, Biology
- Workplaces: University of Malaysia Sarawak
- Thesis: Trophic ecology of a community of south Indian anuran amphibians (1991)

Indraneil Das (born 18 December 1964) is an Indian biologist, whose research focuses on herpetology.

== Biography ==
Das is the son of Chiranjib and Chitra Das (née Ghosh). In 1985, he received his Bachelor of Science degree from the University of Calcutta. In 1988, he completed a Master of Science degree at the University of Bhopal. In 1991, he earned his Ph.D. in animal ecology from the University of Oxford with the dissertation Trophic ecology of a community of south Indian anuran amphibians.

From 1988 to 1998, he was a research associate at the Madras Crocodile Bank Trust and Centre for Herpetology. During his postdoctoral phase, he worked from 1991 to 1993 as a research associate at the University of Brunei Darussalam, and from 1995 to 1996 he was a Fulbright Scholar at Harvard University. Since 1998, he has been an associate professor and researcher at the Institute of Biodiversity and Environmental Conservation (IBEC) of the University of Malaysia Sarawak.

Das is a member of the South Asian Reptile and Amphibian Specialist Group, the Society for Southeast Asian Herpetology, and the European Molecular Biology Association. His research interests focus on the ecology, systematics, and biogeography of amphibians, reptiles, and mammals in tropical Asia.

In 1997, on South Andaman Island, he rediscovered the Andaman shrew (Crocidura andamanensis) and Jenkins's shrew (Crocidura jenkinsi), species previously known only from specimens collected in 1901 and 1972 respectively. In July 2011, Das was part of a scientific team that rediscovered the rainbow toad (Ansonia latidisca), which had been considered lost for 87 years, on Borneo.

== Eponymy ==
In 1998, the toad species Adenomus dasi was described, but in 2009 it was recognized as the long-lost Adenomus kandianus. In 2002, Aaron M. Bauer named the lizard species Cnemaspis indraneildasii in his honor, and in the same year, the lizard species Japalura dasi was also named after him.

== Selected publications ==
- Colour Guide to the Turtles & Tortoises of the Indian Subcontinent (1991)
- Biogeography of the Reptiles of South Asia (1996)
- Herpetological Bibliography of Indonesia (1998)
- The Serpent’s Tongue: A Contribution to the Ethnoherpetology of India and Adjacent Countries (1998)
- Turtles and Tortoises of India (1998)
- Introduction to the Amphibians and Reptiles of Tropical Asia (2002)
- A Photographic Guide to Snakes and other Reptiles of India (2002)
- Snakes and other Reptiles of Sri Lanka (2005)
- A Photographic Guide to Snakes and other Reptiles of Borneo (2006)
- Amphibians and Reptiles of Brunei: A Pocket Guide (2007)
- A Field Guide to the Reptiles of South-East Asia: Myanmar, Thailand, Laos, Cambodia, Vietnam, Peninsular Malaysia, Singapore, Sumatra, Borneo, Java, Bali (2010)
- A Naturalist's Guide to the Snakes of South-East Asia: Malaysia, Singapore, Thailand, Myanmar, Borneo, Sumatra, Java and Bali (2013)
- Naturalists, Explorers and Field Scientists in South-East Asia and Australasia (2016)
