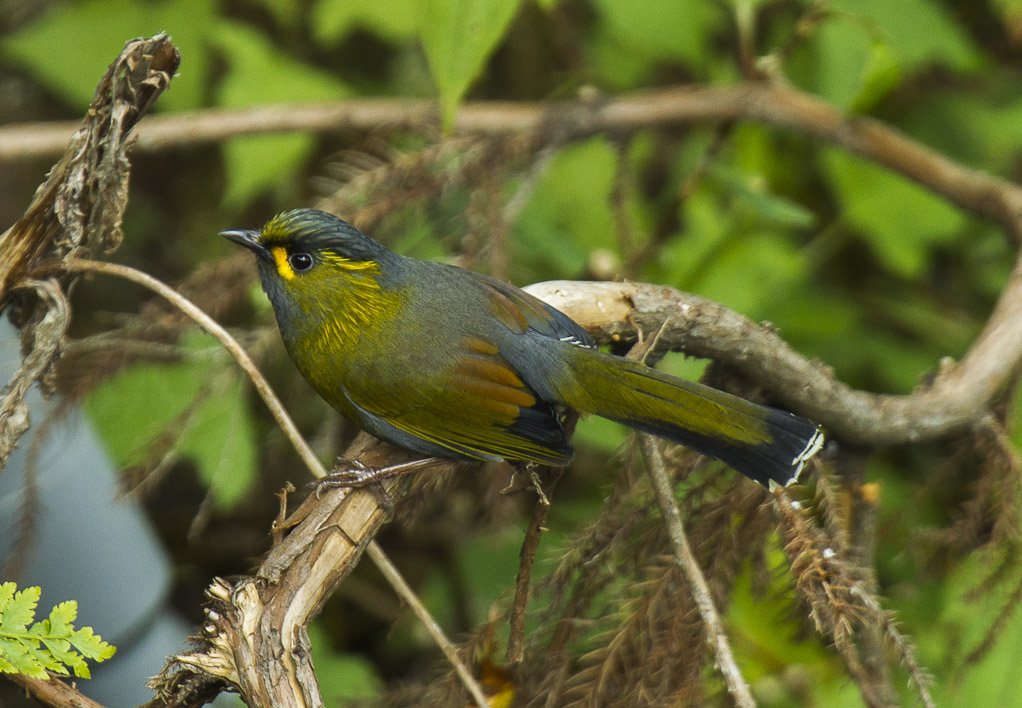

Conservation status
- Least Concern (IUCN 3.1)

Scientific classification
- Kingdom: Animalia
- Phylum: Chordata
- Class: Aves
- Order: Passeriformes
- Family: Leiothrichidae
- Genus: Liocichla
- Species: L. steerii

Binomial name
- Liocichla steerii R. Swinhoe, 1877

= Taiwan liocichla =

Species of bird

The Taiwan liocichla (Liocichla steerii), also known as Steere's liocichla, is a small passerine bird in the laughingthrush family Leiothrichidae. The species was first described by Robert Swinhoe in 1877.

It is endemic to Taiwan.
