= Japalura andersoniana =

Scientific classification
- Kingdom: Animalia
- Phylum: Chordata
- Class: Reptilia
- Order: Squamata
- Suborder: Iguania
- Family: Agamidae
- Genus: Japalura
- Species: J. andersoniana

Binomial name
- Japalura andersoniana Annandale, 1905

Species of lizard

Japalura andersoniana, Anderson's mountain lizard, is a species of lizard in the family Agamidae. The species is native to southern Asia.

== Etymology ==
The specific name, andersoniana, is in honor of Scottish zoologist John Anderson.

== Geographic range ==
J. andersoniana is found in eastern India, and in the part of southwestern China formerly known as Tibet.

== Description ==
J. andersoniana may attain a snout-to-vent length (SVL) of 7.5 cm (3.0 in) and a total length (including tail) of 16 cm (6.3 in). It is brown dorsally and ventrally, and the male has a yellow dewlap.

== Reproduction ==
J. andersoniana is oviparous.
