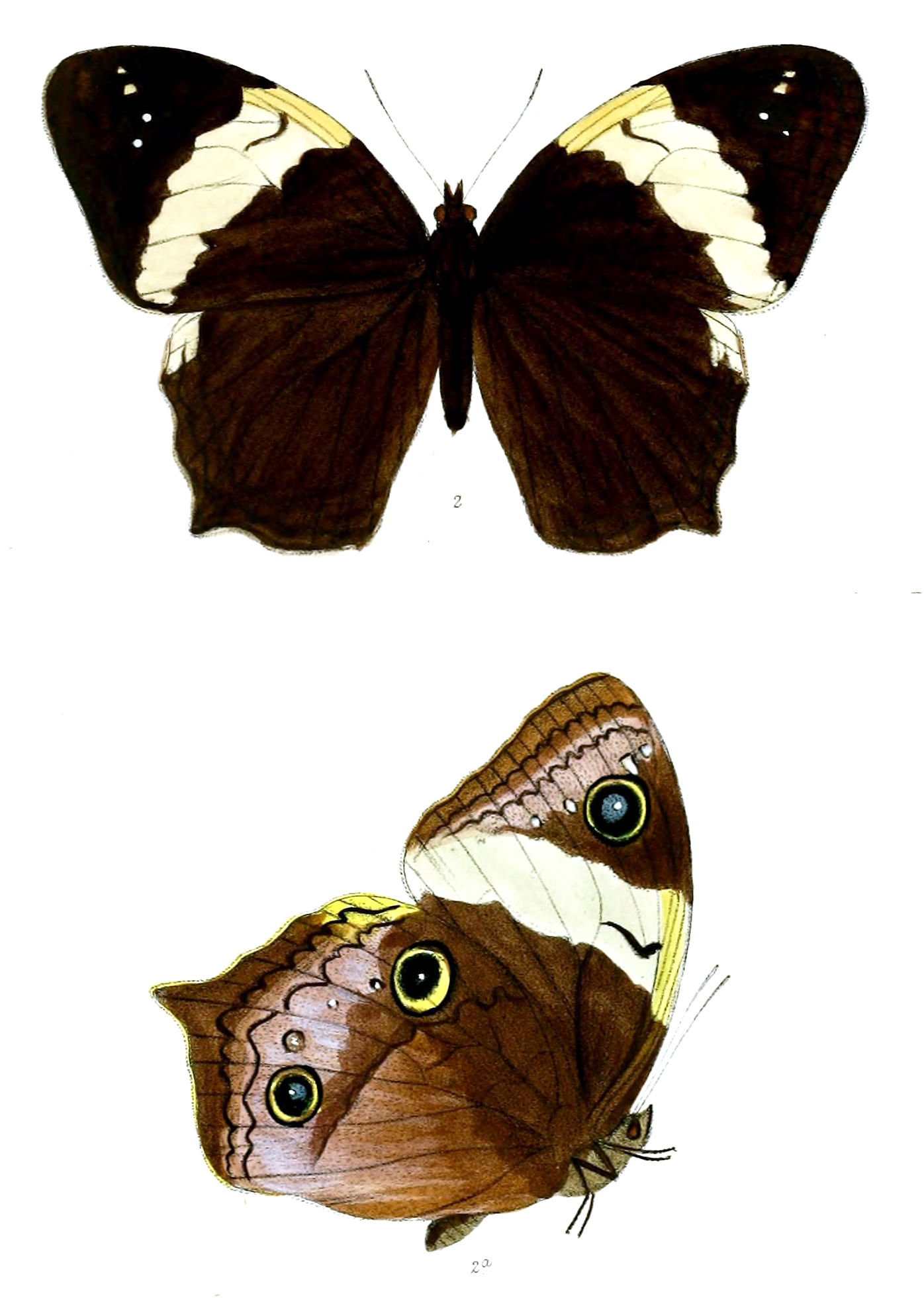
- Neorina patria westwoodi

Scientific classification
- Kingdom: Animalia
- Phylum: Arthropoda
- Clade: Pancrustacea
- Class: Insecta
- Order: Lepidoptera
- Family: Nymphalidae
- Genus: Neorina
- Species: N. patria

Binomial name
- Neorina patria (Leech, 1891)

= Neorina patria =

Species of butterfly

Neorina patria, the white owl, is a species of satyrine butterfly found in India (Assam), Burma, Thailand, Laos and Vietnam.
