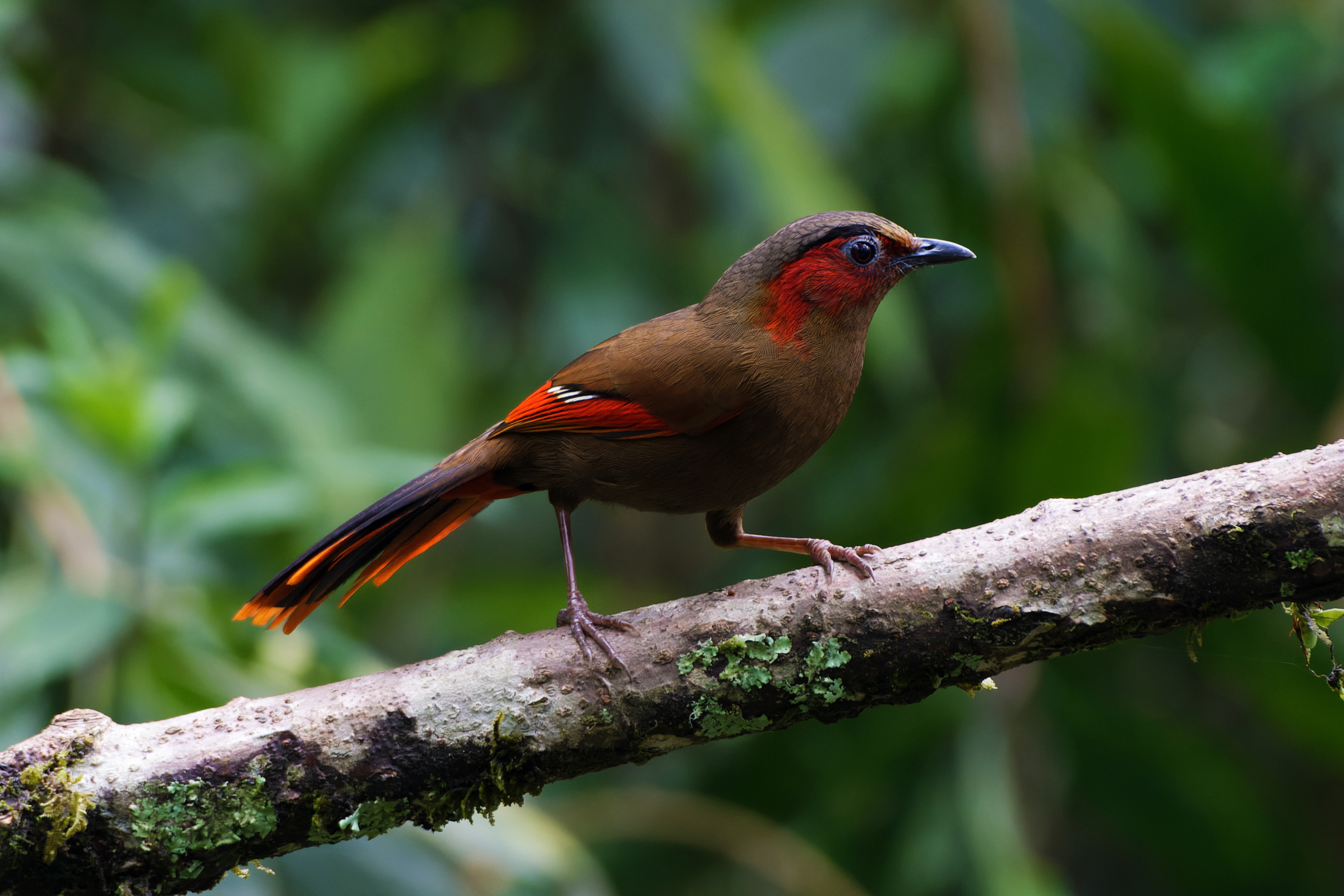

Conservation status
- Least Concern (IUCN 3.1)

Scientific classification
- Kingdom: Animalia
- Phylum: Chordata
- Class: Aves
- Order: Passeriformes
- Family: Leiothrichidae
- Genus: Liocichla
- Species: L. phoenicea

Binomial name
- Liocichla phoenicea (Gould, 1837)

= Red-faced liocichla =

Species of bird

The red-faced liocichla (Liocichla phoenicea) is a species of bird in the family Leiothrichidae.

== Distribution and habitat ==
L. phoenicea is found in Bangladesh, Bhutan, Myanmar, Northeast India, Nepal and western Yunnan. Its natural habitat is subtropical or tropical moist, montane forests. When foraging, it moves through the dense undergrowth of tropical broad-leaf forest in pairs, or in flocks with or without other species.
