= Kameng Elephant Reserve =

Wildlife sanctuary in Arunachal Pradesh, India

- IUCN category IV (habitat/species management area)
- Location within Arunachal Pradesh Location within India
- Coordinates: 27°05′N 92°26′E
- Area: 1,892 km^{2} (731 sq mi)
- Established: 2002

The Kameng Elephant Reserve, also known as the Kameng Protected Area Complex, is a protected area in the East and West Kameng districts of western Arunachal Pradesh, India. The reserve comprises the three protected areas of Sessa Orchid Sanctuary, Eaglenest Wildlife Sanctuary, and Pakke Tiger Reserve, as well as the Amortala, Doimara and Papum reserved forests within the Khellong Forest Division. With a total area of 1,892 km^{2} (731 sq mi) and altitudinal range of 106–3,222 m (348–10,600 ft), the reserve has rugged, heavily forested terrain. Alongside the neighbouring Nameri National Park and Sonai Rupai Wildlife Sanctuary in Assam, the reserve is part of a contiguous forested area of almost 3,500 km^{2} (1,400 sq mi).

Notified as an Elephant Reserve by the Indian government in 2002, Kameng Elephant Reserve harbours a population of 450–612 Asian elephants according to a 2008 survey estimate. Other mammals found in the reserve include tigers, leopards, clouded leopards, gaur, Asian black bears, red panda, and snow leopards. The reserve is highly biodiverse, with surveys of its constituent protected areas having documented 353 species of birds, 463 species of butterflies, 120 species of mammals, and 35 species of reptiles. The Bugun liocichla and the frog Leptobrachium bompu are both endemic to the Eaglenest Wildlife Sanctuary.

== Geography ==
The Kameng Elephant Reserve has a total area of 1,892 km^{2} (731 sq mi) and lies entirely in western Arunachal Pradesh. Located in the districts of East and West Kameng, it was notified as an Elephant Reserve by the Indian government in 2002 under the ambit of Project Elephant. To the south, the reserve borders the state of Assam, including Nameri National Park and the Sonai Rupai Wildlife Sanctuary. Taken together across the two states, these protected areas cover a forested area of almost 3,500 km^{2} (1,400 sq mi).

Ranging altitudinally from 106–3,222 m (348–10,600 ft), the reserve includes the Sessa Orchid Sanctuary, Eaglenest Wildlife Sanctuary, Pakke Tiger Reserve, and the Amortala, Doimara and Papum reserved forests within the Khellong Forest Division. The reserve's rugged terrain consists of mountains, hills, valleys, and narrow plains, with numerous streams. The forests within the reserve have a diverse mix of vegetation types, including Kayea Forest, Assam Alluvial Plains Semi-Evergreen Forest, East Himalayan Subtropical Wet Hill, Assam Subtropical Pine Forest, and East Himalayan Mixed Coniferous Forest.

== Climate ==
The Kameng Elephant Reserve has four seasons: winter from December–February, pre-monsoon from March–May, monsoon from June–September, and post-monsoon from October to November. 2,235–3,489 mm (88.0–137.4 in) of rainfall occurs throughout the year, with June and July being the wettest months. The lower regions of the reserve have high summer and moderate winter temperatures, but areas at high elevations face temperatures below 0 °C (32 °F) during the winter, with heavy snowfall from December to February. Humidity in the reserve varies from 40% to 85%.

== Ecology ==
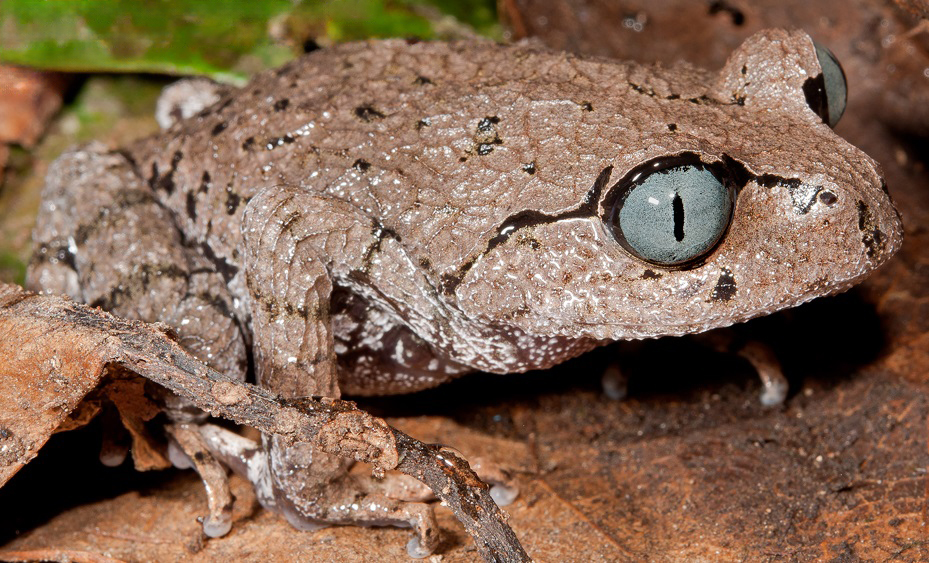
Leptobrachium bompu, a frog endemic to the Kameng Elephant Reserve

=== Fauna ===
The Kameng Elephant Reserve is highly biodiverse, with 120 species of mammals, 35 species of reptiles, 29 species of amphibians, and 40 species of fish having been recorded from the Pakke Tiger Reserve within it. Major mammals from the reserve include Asian elephants, tigers, leopards, clouded leopards, gaur, Asian black bears, red panda, and snow leopards. A 2003 survey of Eaglenest Wildlife Sanctuary, Sessa Orchid Sanctuary, and parts of the Doimara reserved forest found 353 species of birds, including three threatened species and five near-threatened species. 463 species of butterflies have been recorded in the Kameng Elephant Reserve. The Bugun liocichla and the frog Leptobrachium bompu are both known only from the Eaglenest Wildlife Sanctuary within the reserve.

A 2001 census estimated the elephant population in the park to be 470. A 2008 study estimated the population to be 450–612 based on the density of dung piles within the reserve.

=== Flora ===
The Kameng Elephant Reserve's vegetation consists of evergreen forest, semi-evergreen forest, grassland, coniferous forest, and alpine forest. A 2008 study that sampled an area of 3,600 m^{2} (39,000 sq ft) found 47 species of plants belonging to 27 families.
