= Wakro =

- Village
- Location in Arunachal Pradesh, India Wakro (India)
- Coordinates: 27°46′59″N 96°20′52″E
- Country: India
- State: Arunachal Pradesh
- District: Lohit

Population (2011)
  - Total: 1,215

Languages
- Time zone: UTC+5:30 (IST)
- PIN: 792102
- Telephone code: 03804
- Vehicle registration: AR 11
- Nearest city: Tezu
- Civic agency: Gram Panchayat

Wakro (Wakro H.Q.) is a village in Wakro circle of the Lohit district in Arunachal Pradesh state of India. The PIN code of Wakro is 792102. Wakro is connected by two national highways, National Highway 13 and National Highway 15

== Demographics ==
As per 2011 Census of India, the total number of households in Wakro was 304 and total population was 1,215 persons. There were total of 617 male persons and 598 females and a total number of 158 children of 6 years or below in Wakro. The percentage of male population was 50.8% and the percentage of female population was 49.2%. Average Sex Ratio of wakro is 969 which is higher than Arunachal Pradesh state average of 938. The local population is primarily Mishmi people.

== Tourist attractions ==
There are a number of tourist attractions near Wakro.

- Parshuram Kund
- Kamlang Wildlife Sanctuary
- Namdapha National Park
- Glao Lake
