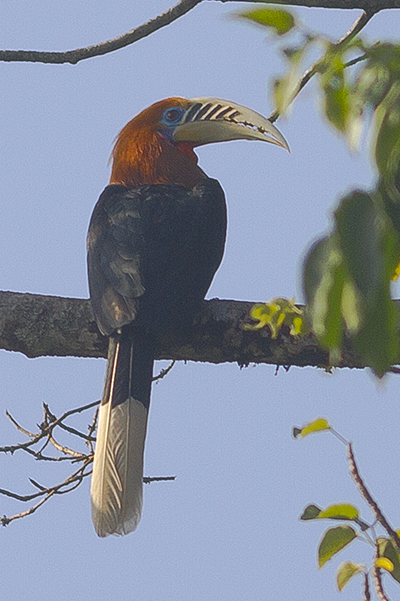
- An adult male in Mahananda Wildlife Sanctuary
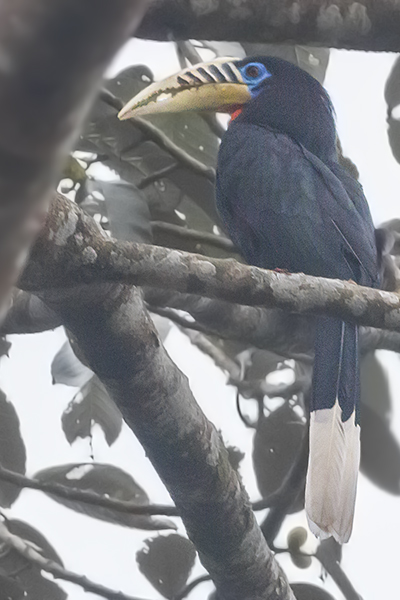
- An adult female in Mahananda Wildlife Sanctuary

Conservation status
- Vulnerable (IUCN 3.1)
- CITES Appendix I

Scientific classification
- Kingdom: Animalia
- Phylum: Chordata
- Class: Aves
- Order: Bucerotiformes
- Family: Bucerotidae
- Genus: Aceros; Hodgson, 1844
- Species: A. nipalensis

Binomial name
- Aceros nipalensis (Hodgson, 1829)

= Rufous-necked hornbill =

Species of bird

The rufous-necked hornbill (Aceros nipalensis) is a species of hornbill in Bhutan, northeastern India, especially in Arunachal Pradesh, Indian subcontinent and Southeast Asia. It is locally extinct in Nepal due to hunting and significant loss of habitat. There are less than 10,000 adults left in the wild. With a length of about 117 cm (46 in), it is among the largest Bucerotine hornbills. The underparts, neck and head are pigmented as a rich rufous in the male, but black in the female.

== Taxonomy ==
The scientific name Buceros nipalensis was coined for the rufous-necked hornbill by the English naturalist Brian Houghton Hodgson in 1829 who described several rufous-necked hornbills caught by hunters in sal forests in Nepal. The species was placed in the genus Aceros by Hodgson in 1844. The authorship of the genus name has sometimes been credited to John Edward Gray but Gray was the editor not the author of the list. The genus name comes from Ancient Greek ἀ- (a-), meaning "-less", and κέρας (kéras), meaning "horn", and thus, "horn-less".

== Description ==
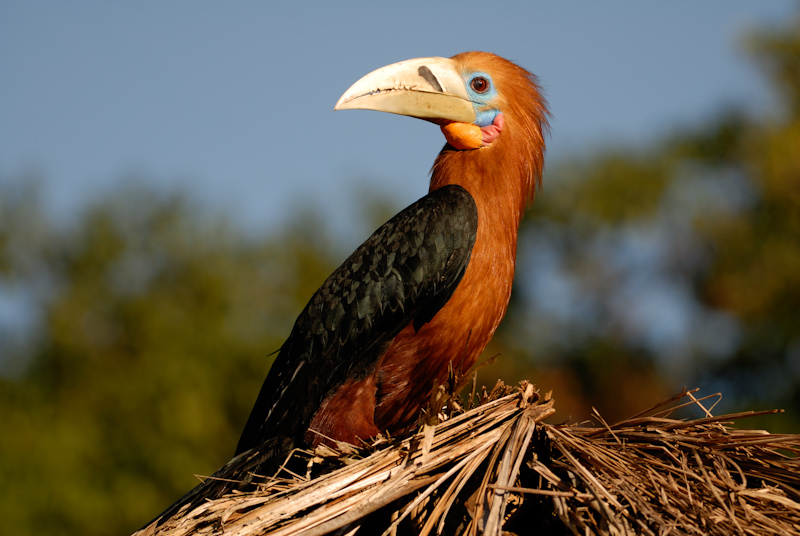
An immature in Namdapha National Park

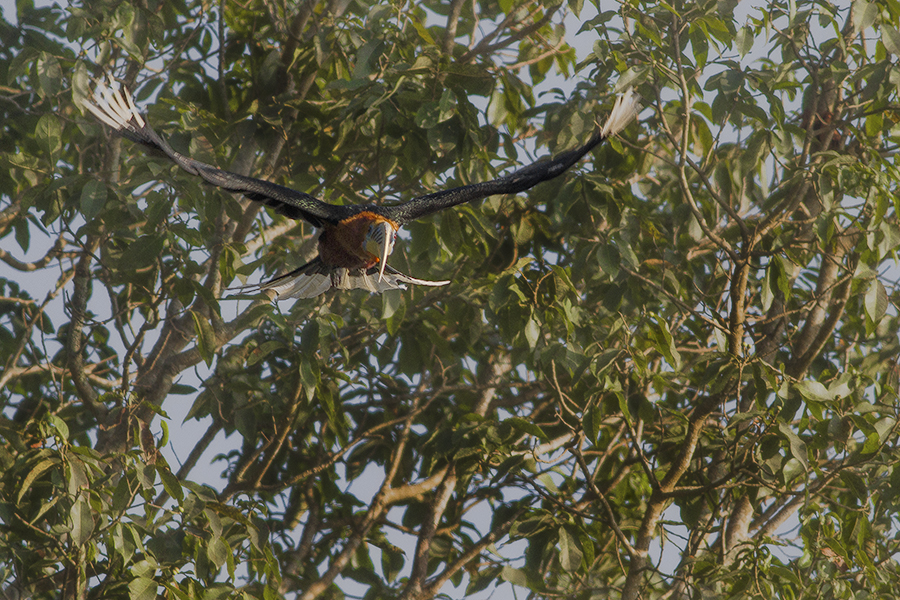
An adult in flight Mahananda Wildlife Sanctuary

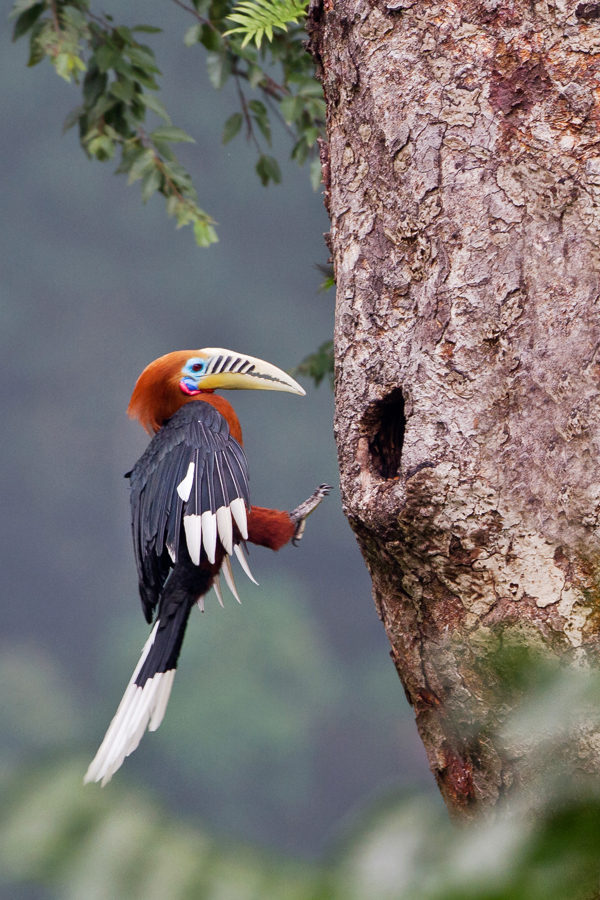
An adult in Mahananda Wildlife Sanctuary

The head, neck, and lower body of the male are coloured rufous, with deeper colouration on the flanks and abdomen. The middle primaries and the lower half of the tail are tipped white. The rest of the hornbill's plumage is a glossy dark-green and black. The lower tail-covert feathers are coloured chestnut mixed with black. The female is black, except for the end-portion of her tail and the tips of the middle primaries, which are white. Juvenile hornbills resemble adults of the same sex, but lack the ridges at the base of the upper beak. The beak lacks a true casque but is thickened at its base. It has a number of dark ridges on the upper beak which are absent in the young and increase in number with age up to about seven. The commissure of the beaks is broken in both sexes.

== Distribution and habitat ==
The rufous-necked hornbill has the northernmost distribution ranging from Northeast India, central Bhutan to western Thailand and northwestern Vietnam. It ranges over an area of 1,163,811 km^{2} (449,350 sq mi), of which 825,837 km^{2} (318,857 sq mi) is forested. Within this area, it lives in 90 protected areas comprising 54,955 km^{2} (21,218 sq mi) of protected forest but only including 7% of optimal hornbill habitat. Mahananda Wildlife Sanctuary in West Bengal represents its westernmost limit; it has also been recorded in Buxa Tiger Reserve, Manas National Park, Eaglenest Wildlife Sanctuary, Sessa Orchid Sanctuary, Kamlang Wildlife Sanctuary, Namdapha National Park and Pakke Tiger Reserve.

It predominantly inhabits ridged and hilly forests, primarily temperate broadleaf and mixed forests at elevations of 150–2,200 m (490–7,220 ft), It has also been recorded in dry woodland.

== Behaviour and ecology ==
The nesting period is from March to June, the trees preferred are tall and have broad girths. These hornbill communities move between one forest to another depending on seasonally to forage from fruiting trees that change with local conditions. Describing the egg, Hume (1889) states:

The egg is a broad oval, compressed somewhat towards one end, so as to be slightly pyriform. The shell is strong and thick, but coarse and entirely glossless, everywhere pitted with minute pores. In colour it is a very dirty white, with a pale dirty yellowish tinge, and everywhere obscurely stippled, when closely examined, with minute purer white specks, owing to the dirt not having got down into the bottoms of the pores. It measures 2–25 by 1'75 (inches).

== Conservation ==
Already listed in CITES Appendices I, the species is vulnerable but occurs in a number of protected areas in India, China, Thailand and Bhutan. Due to increased information coming in about range and extent, it has been suggested that the rufous-necked hornbill be downgraded from IUCN status "Vulnerable" to "Near Threatened".

Recent initiatives by the Wildlife Trust of India, Arunachal Pradesh Forest Department and other citizens to conserve hornbills, which also target the rufous-necked hornbill, are the Hornbill Nest Adoption Programme, and a programme for replacing the use of real beaks with fibre-made replicas.

== In culture ==
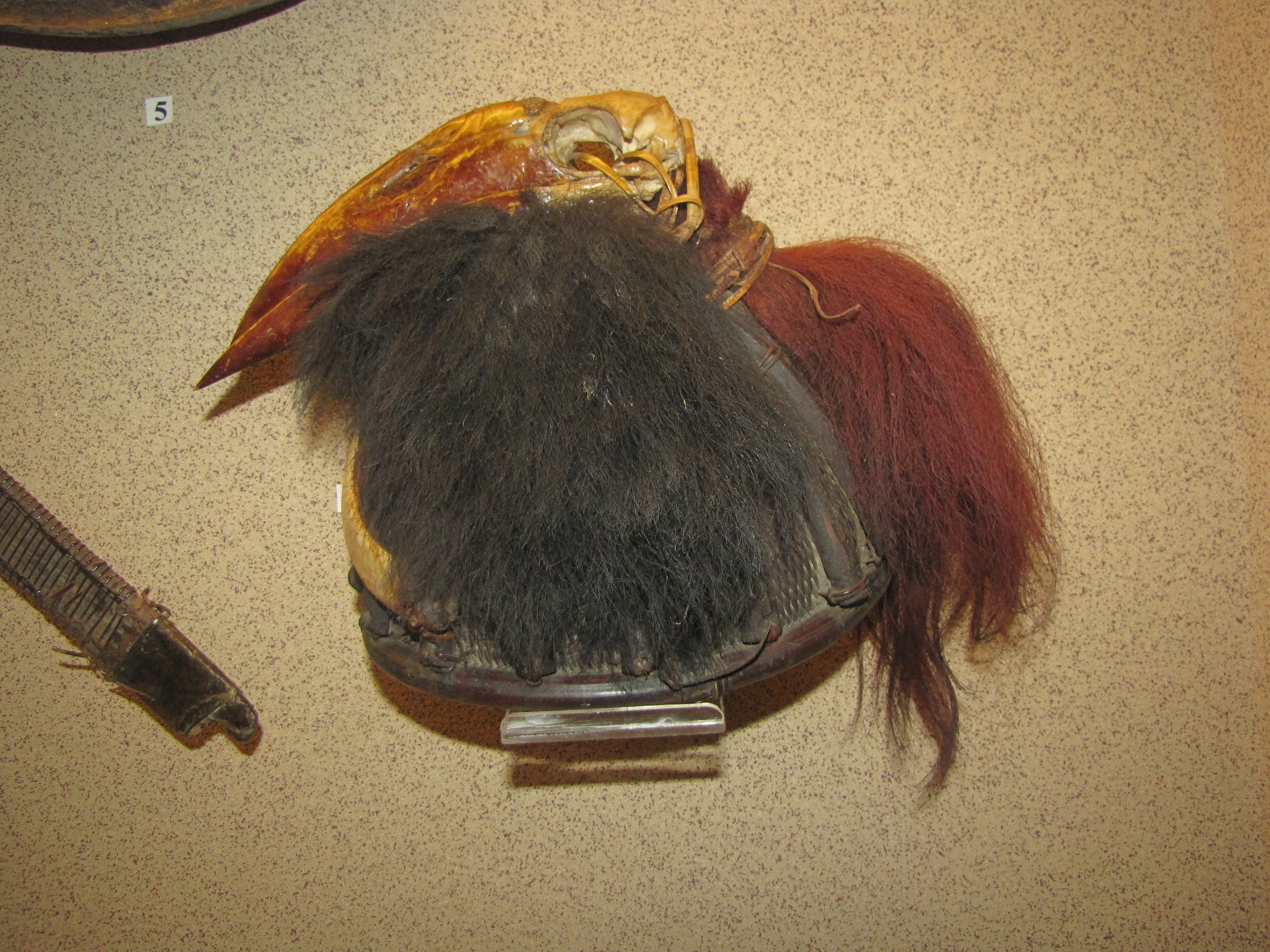
"Bulup" or Cane hat of the Minyong tribe of East Siang district of Arunachal Pradesh with hornbill beak, most likely that of rufous-coloured hornbill

The rufous-necked hornbill occurs in Sanskrit literature under the epithet vārdhrīnasa, a term which at times also has been used to refer to other Bucerotidae.

In Arunachal Pradesh, rufous-necked hornbills have been hunted by tribals for their feathers and beaks.
