= Tafra Gam =

Village in Lohit district, Arunachal Pradesh, India

Tafra Gam Tafragram
- Village
- Map of Arunachal Pradesh Tafra Gam (India)
- Coordinates: 27.9789°N 96.2357°E
- Country: India
- State: Arunachal Pradesh
- District: Lohit
- Gram Panchayat: Tafra Gam

Population (2011)
  - Total: 1,805

Languages
- Time zone: UTC+5:30 (IST)
- Postal code: 792001
- Census code: 266396

Tafra Gam is a census village and Gram Panchayat in Lohit district, Arunachal Pradesh, India. As per the 2011 Census of India, Tafra Gam has total population of 1,805 people, including 785 males and 1,020 females.
