= Environment and Forests Department (Arunachal Pradesh) =

Department of Environment and Forests of Arunachal Pradesh
- Official seal of the DEFAP

Agency overview
- Jurisdiction: State Government of Arunachal Pradesh
- Headquarters: Itanagar, Arunachal Pradesh
- Parent agency: State government of Arunachal Pradesh
- Website: arunachalpradesh.nic.in

The Department of Environment and Forests of Arunachal Pradesh (DEFAP) is a state-sponsored agency responsible for conserving the environment, identifying, establishing, and conserving protected areas in the Indian state of Arunachal Pradesh.

== Statistics ==
According to the official website, 10185.40 square kilometers are being protected by the agency. That equals 12 percent of the total area of the state and 15 percent of the total forest cover in the state - 68,045 square kilometers. There are 8,715 species of plant life within Arunachal's forests, which contributes to the importance of wildlife reserves. Arunachal is a very rural state, and most of the state is covered in forests. As such, forest and wildlife protection is extremely important to the people living in Arunachal Pradesh.

== Sanctuaries ==
There are a total of eight wildlife sanctuaries and one reserve in Arunachal Pradesh protected by the Department of Environment and Forests:

- Dibang Wildlife Sanctuary
- Mehao Wildlife Sanctuary
- Pakhui Tiger Reserve
- Kamlang Wildlife Sanctuary
- Eaglenest Wildlife Sanctuary
- D'Ering Memorial Wildlife Sanctuary
- Itanagar Wildlife Sanctuary
- Sessa Orchid Wildlife Sanctuary
- Kane Wildlife Sanctuary

== See also ==
- Wildlife sanctuaries of India
- Protected area
