= Dumsi =

Village in Arunachal Pradesh, India

Coordinates: 27.635°N 95.808°E

Dumsi is a village in the Lekang (Mahadevpur) sub-district of Lohit district in Arunachal Pradesh, India. According to the 2011 Census of India it had 525 residents in 103 households. 262 were male and 263 were female.
