= Nameri National Park =

National park in Assam, India

Nameri National Park & Tiger Reserve
- IUCN category II (national park)
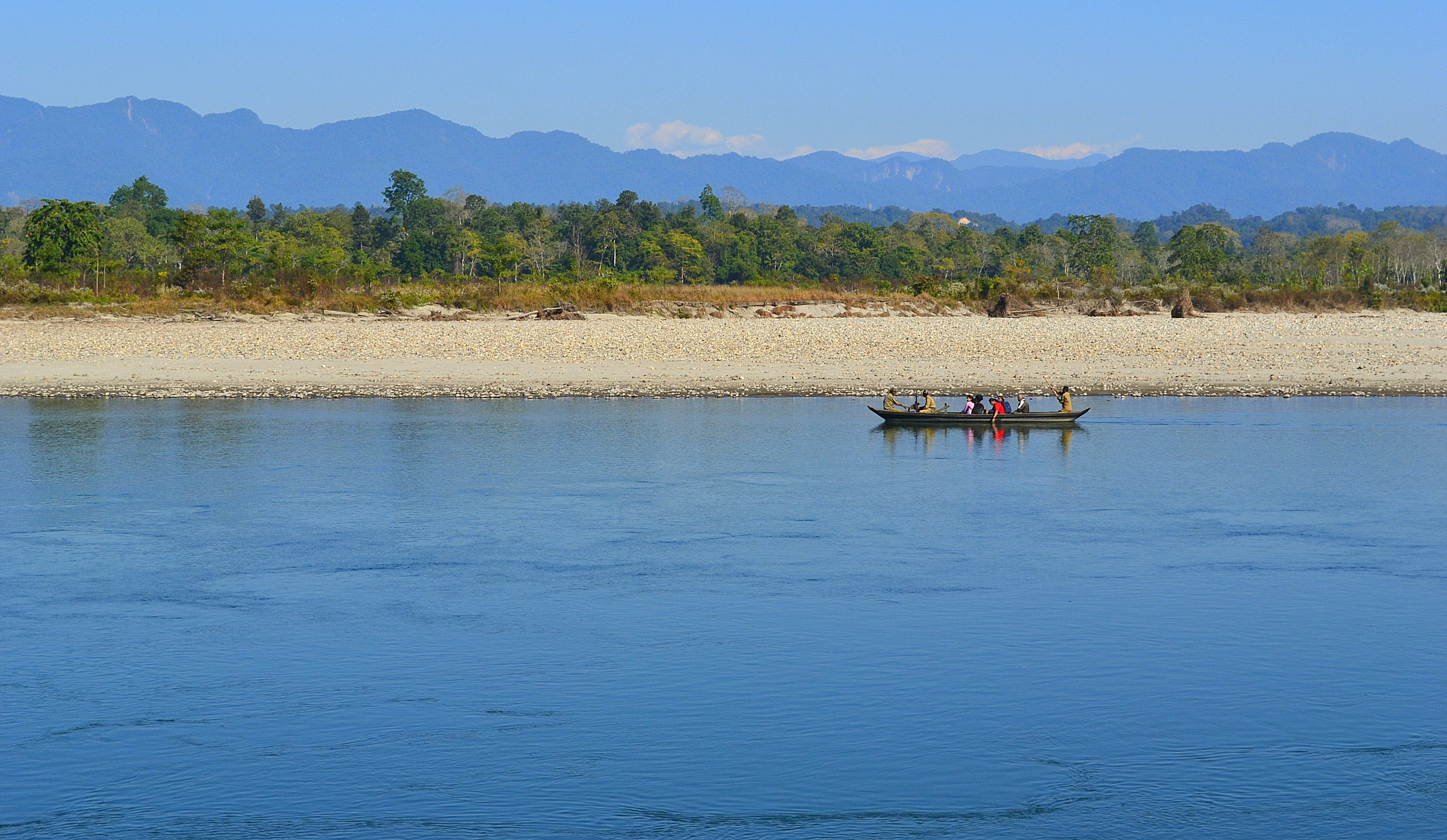
- River in Nameri National Park

- Location within Assam Location within India
- Interactive map of Nameri National Park & Tiger Reserve
- Location: Sonitpur, Assam India
- Nearest city: Tezpur, India
- Coordinates: 27°0′36″N 92°47′24″E
- Area: 200 km^{2} (77.2 sq mi)
- Established: 1978; 48 years ago
- Governing body: Ministry of Environment and Forests, Government of India
- Website: nameritr.org

Nameri National Park is a national park in the foothills of the eastern Himalayas in the Sonitpur District of Assam, India, about 35 km (22 mi) from Tezpur. Nameri is about 9 km (5.6 mi) from Chariduar, the nearest village. It shares its northern boundary with the Pakhui Wildlife Sanctuary of Arunachal Pradesh. Together they constitute an area of over 1,000 km^{2} (390 sq mi), of which Nameri has a total area of 200 km^{2} (77 sq mi). Nameri National Park was declared as the second Tiger Reserve in the year 2000, and is the second Tiger reserve of Assam after Manas Tiger Reserve. It has two core areas: Nameri National Park and Sonai- Rupai Wildlife (Satellite Core of the Nameri Tiger Reserve). The river Jia-Bharali is the lifeline of Nameri, which flows along the southern boundary of the park from northwest to southeast. In the east, the river Bor-Dikorai is a tributary of river Jia-Bharali, flowing along the southern boundary from northeast to southwest.

== Rivers ==
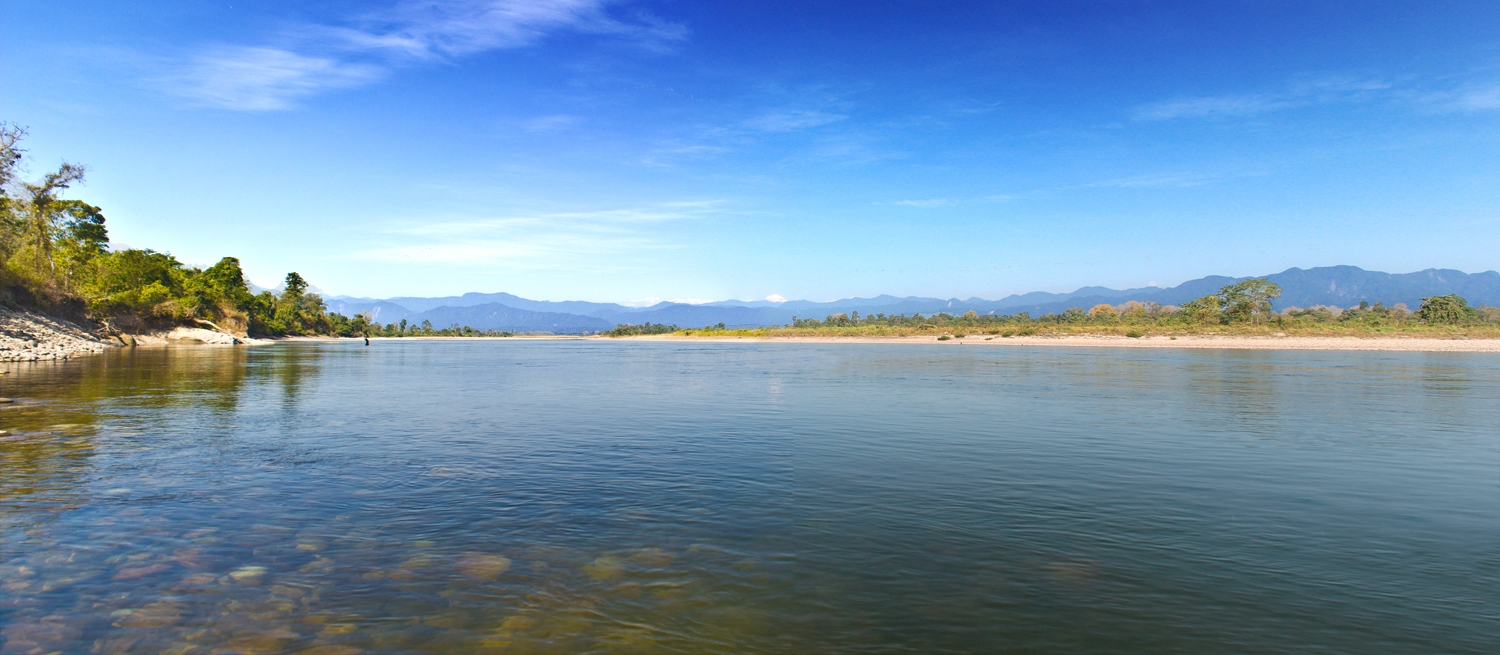
River in Nameri National Park

The Kameng River of Assam was famous since the time of British for the golden mahseer angling. The main rivers are Jia-Bhoroli and Bor Dikorai. Other tributaries of these two rivers are Diju, Dinai, Nameri, Khari, Upper Dikiri which originates in the Arunachal Himalayas.

== Flora ==
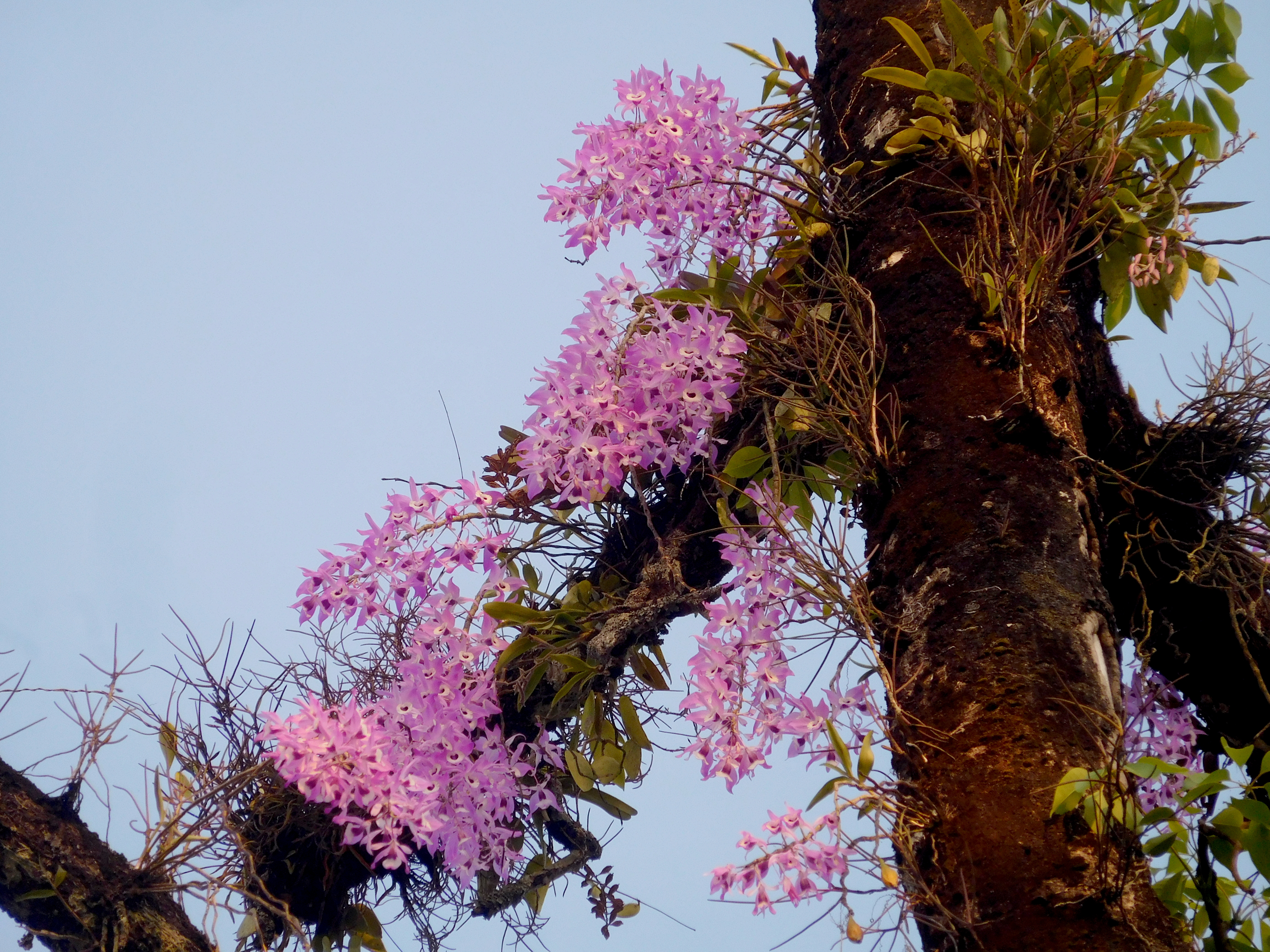
An orchid in Nameri National Park

Nameri National Park harbours over 600 floral species including Gmelina arborea, Michelia champaca, Amoora wallichi, Chukrasia tabularis, Lagerstroemia speciosa, Urium poma, Bhelu, agarwood, Rudraksha, Bonjolokia, Hatipolia akhakan, Terminalia myriocarpa, Mesua ferrea. It is home for orchids like Dendrobium, Cymbidium and Cypripedioideae.

== Fauna ==
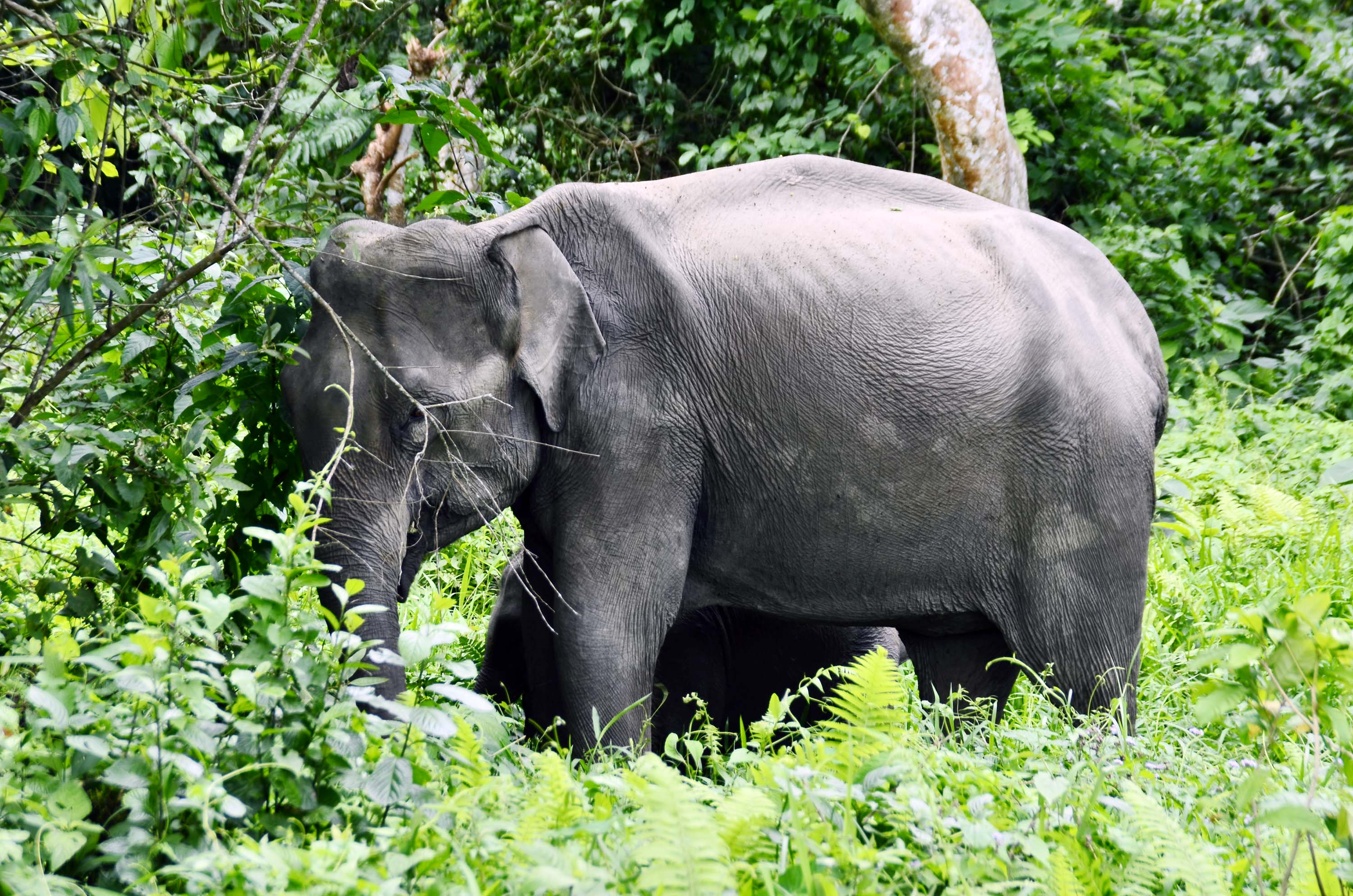
Wild elephant at Nameri National Park

Nameri National Park provides habitat for Bengal tiger, Indian leopard, clouded leopard, marbled cat, leopard cat, hog deer, sambar, dhole, gaur, barking deer, wild boar, sloth bear, Himalayan black bear, capped langur and Indian giant squirrel. The white winged wood duck, great pied hornbill, wreathed hornbill, rufous necked hornbill, black stork, ibisbill, blue-bearded bee-eaters, Old World babblers, plovers and many other birds are also present.

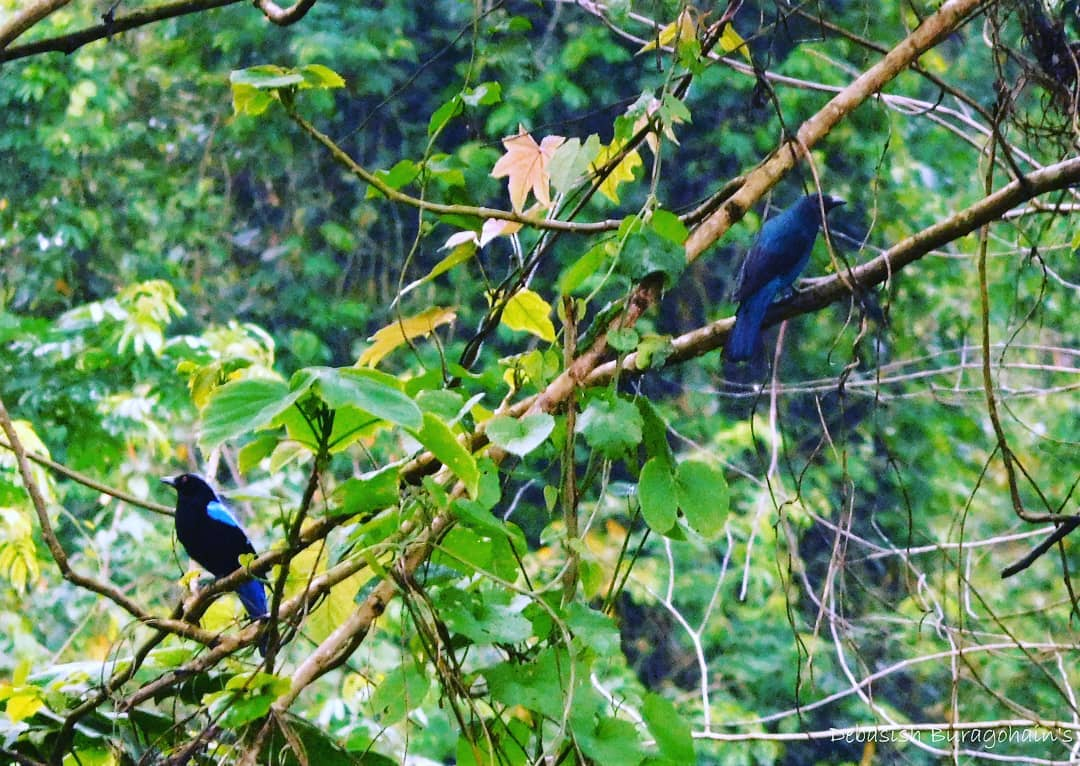
A pair of Asian fairy bluebirds in Nameri National Park

In 2005, 374 bird species were recorded in Nameri National Park.

== Conflicts and threats ==
Nameri faces two threats: One is due to continued official logging in the area of Sonitpur. The other major threat for Nameri is human/animal conflict due to around 3000 cattle grazing the forest. There is another human–animal conflict due to the vast group of elephants in Nameri. This conflict arose mainly due to herds of Indian elephants raiding crops, damaging homes and killing cattle due to forest cover dropping below 30-40%. In 2001, there were 18 elephant deaths.
