= Tezu Jama Mosque, Arunachal Pradesh =

Mosque in Tezu, Arunachal Pradesh, India

Tezu Jama Mosque
- Location in Arunachal Pradesh

Religion
- Affiliation: Islam
- Ecclesiastical or organisational status: Mosque
- Status: Active

Location
- Location: Tezu, Arunachal Pradesh
- Country: India
- Coordinates: 27°54′45″N 96°09′51″E

Architecture
- Type: Mosque
- Style: Islamic

Specifications
- Dome: 1
- Minaret: 2

The Tezu Jama Mosque is a mosque located in Tezu, in the state of Arunachal Pradesh, India.

== Overview ==
Tezu is in the Lohit district of Arunachal Pradesh. The small township is noted for its religious milieu, and is one of the region's tourist attractions. With its rivers and valleys, the small place can be a paradise for the visitors. Tezu Jama Masjid is an attractive place for everybody because of its grandeur in architecture. Located in the main town of Tezu, the mosque is frequented by hundreds of people every day for everyday prayer sessions.

It was built in 1826.

== See also ==
- Islam in India
- List of mosques in India
