= Dangku =

Dangku is a village in the Sunpura sub-district of Lohit district in Arunachal Pradesh, India. According to the 2011 Census of India it had 213 residents in 39 households. 110 were male and 103 were female.
