= Jaweplu Chai =

Indian female judge

Jaweplu Chai is an Indian female judge currently posted in Arunachal Pradesh, in the northeastern part of the country. In 2013, Chai became the first woman judge of her state. She was posted as an additional district and sessions’ judge at Basar in West Siang district.

Previously, Chai also became the first lawyer in her community called Mishmi, which has a population of around 30,000 in the hilly state bordering China. In April 2013, she topped the Arunachal Pradesh Judicial Service examination.

Chai studied at TCM Government Upper Primary School and at Government HS School, Tezu before moving to Shillong in Meghalaya for Bachelor of Degree and law course.
