= Rohan Chakravarty =

Indian cartoonist

Rohan Chakravarty is an Indian artist, cartoonist, illustrator and naturalist. His "Green Humour" series was picked up by GoComics in 2013 making Rohan the first Indian cartoonist to be picked by a global comics distributor. Green Humour has also been published as a book, as a series in two national newspapers, and in places like Tinkle and by government departments in India such as the Department of Environment and Forest of Arunachal Pradesh. He has won a number of awards for his work. Rohan grew up in Nagpur where he studied to be a dentist. It was here that he was introduced to the world of wildlife through a nature based outreach program conducted by Sanctuary Asia. His professional cartoon work started when he was 16. A trip to Nagzira Wildlife Sanctuary and his first tiger sighting inspired him.

== Publications ==
- Green Humour for a Greying Planet, Penguin Random House, 2021
- Naturalist Ruddy: Adventurer. Sleuth. Mongoose, Penguin Random House, 2021
- Bird Business: Illustrated Peeks Into the Daily Lives of Indian Birds, Bombay Natural History Society, 2019
- Making Friends with Snakes (But from a Distance), Pratham Books with Madras Crocodile Bank Trust
- The Great Indian Nature Trail with Uncle Bikky, WWF India, 2018 with Bijal Vachharagani
