= Sunpura =

Town in Lohit District, Arunachal Pradesh, India

- Village
- Map of Arunachal Pradesh Sunpura (India)
- Coordinates: 27.8502°N 95.9079°E
- Country: India
- State: Arunachal Pradesh
- District: Lohit
- Subdivision: Sunpura

Area
  - Total: 585.37 km^{2} (226.01 sq mi)

Population (2011)
  - Total: 5,529
  - Density: 9.445/km^{2} (24.46/sq mi)

Languages
- Time zone: UTC+5:30 (IST)
- Postal code: 792111
- STD Code: 03804
- Census code: 266377

Sunpura is a census Town and Sub-division in Lohit district, Arunachal Pradesh, India. Sunpura is bordering with the state Assam. Sunpura sub-division has a total of 17 villages. As per the 2011 Census of India, it has a total population of 5,529 people including 2,847 males and 2,682 females.

The Government of India listed Sunpura as "disturbed areas" with the imposition of the Armed Forces Special Powers Act (AFSPA).
