= Kameng =

Kameng may refer to:

- Kameng Elephant Reserve, an elephant reserve in Northeast India
- Kameng River, Arunachal Pradesh in Northeast India
- East Kameng District, Arunachal Pradesh
- West Kameng District, Arunachal Pradesh
- Kameng Dolo, Indian politician
