= Kolong River =

Coordinates: 25°57′11″N 92°46′46″E

The Kolong River or Kailang is an anabranch of the Brahmaputra River, which diverts out from the Brahamputra river in Hatimura region of Jakhalabandha (Nagaon district, Assam, India), and meets the same at Kolongpar near Guwahati. The tributary is about 250 kilometres (160 mi) long and flows through the districts of Nagaon, Morigaon and Kamrup. On the way, several smaller streams (Diju, Missa River and others) meet it. The river flows through the heart of the Nagaon urban area, dividing the town into Nagaon and Haiborgaon.

== History and cultural influence ==
=== Medieval history ===
Bhuyan settlement in the Kalang valley is there since 13th-14th century as suggested by some religious literature. There had been also Kachari people settled. Since the reign of Swargadeo Suhungmung Dihingia roja when the Ahom kingdom extended much westward, it gained strategic, political and also commercial and economic importance.

Swargadeo Pratap Singha established a large numbers of well planned villages on it both banks and founded the stations for the frontier Governors like- Roha Choki, Jagi Choki and Kajali Choki in different places of its banks. And since 17th century it served as a main channel of communication between the Ahom-Kachari and Ahom-Jayantia territories.

There was an army station of the Ahoms with 300 boats at the mouth of the Kalang and a battle that took place there with the Mughals. Swargadeo Jayadhwaj Singha built two bridges over it as a part of war preparation against the Mughal

=== Modern history ===
In the colonial period, though, the river was known to be widely used for passenger and goods transport, specially because the road and rail network was undeveloped or underdeveloped during that period. That is why the British colonial administration almost established the district headquarters in Puranigudam, on the bank of the river.

Until the colonial period, the Kolong river and smaller streams feeding the river were the main sources of potable water. Most of the villages were settled along their banks. People became heartily attached to the river, and as one folk tale says, it was just "Kolong" for them, they refused to say it was even a river.

In those days, the river created havoc by flooding the lowland areas in the present Nagaon and Morigaon districts during the rainy season, as it received water not only from the smaller streams, but also from the overflowing Brahmaputra. In the 1960s, a major flood threatened the existence of the Nagaon town itself, which lies in a lowland area. The mouth of the river, in Hatimura region of Jakhalabandha, was permanently closed subsequently, allowing the river to carry the water only from the smaller streams to Brahmaputra. Following this, the threat of flood disappeared. However, due to lack of enough water, especially during the dry winter, the river dried almost halfway. In several places, the river presently looks like a closed pond, covered with water hyacinth. Due to the lack of current, many sand-sores were formed in and around the river. The population of flora and fauna also diminished on the river and several other water bodies.

Numerous fictional and non-fictional, famous and not-so-famous articles, and poems have been written taking the river as a main subject or character. Assamese poet and novelist Nabakanta Barua wrote a famous novel Kokadeutar Had: The Bone of (my) Grandfather, fictionalizing the river and its history.

Several bihugeets (songs sung during Bihu) and modern Assamese songs mention Kolong.

== 21st century ==
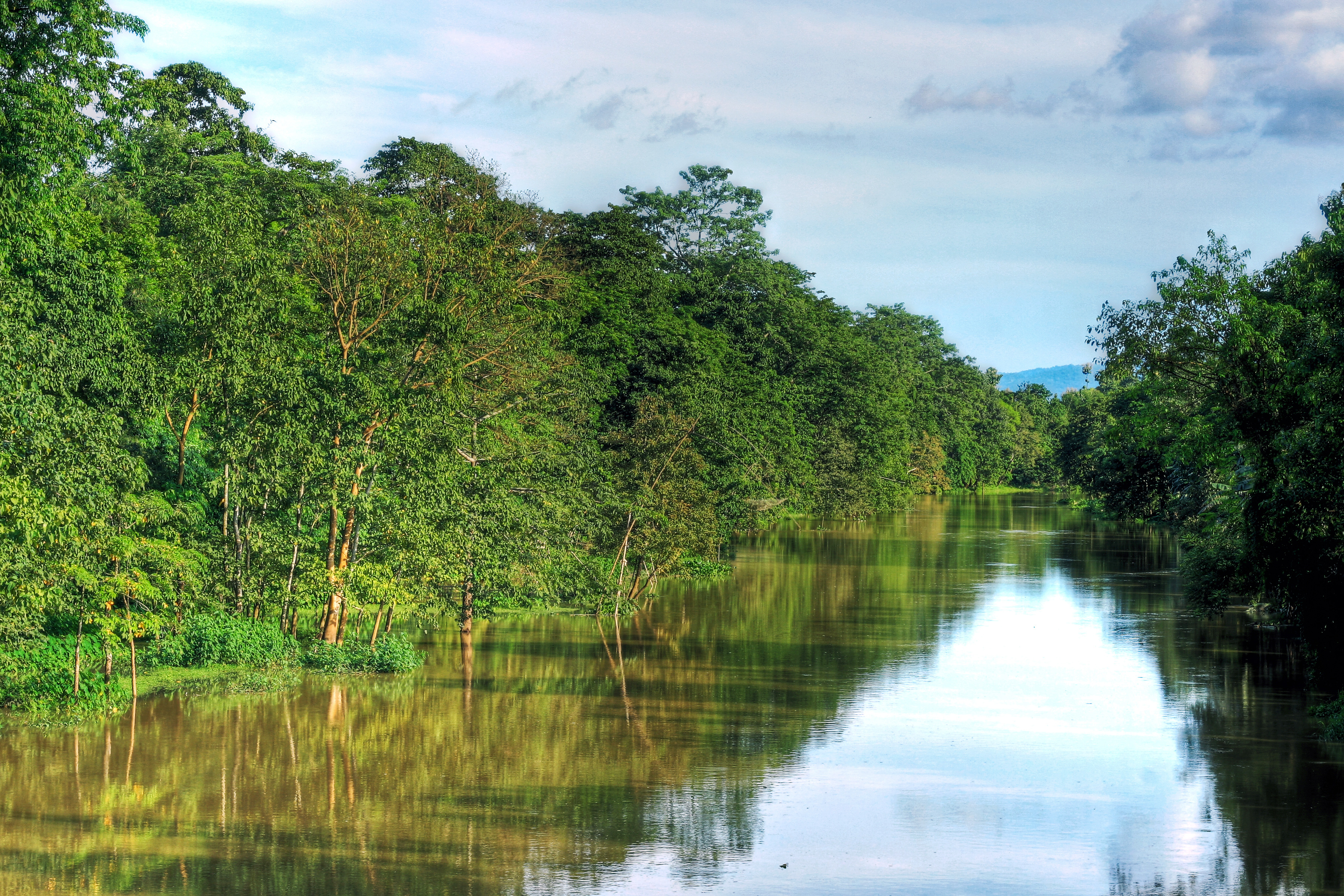
A view of river Kolong from Diphalu bridge in Nagaon town of Assam

The river is almost dry now and is hardly seen flowing in the dry season. Several organizations including North East Centre for Environmental Research and Development (NE-CERD) advocate the re-opening of the river-mouth for its revival. NE-CERD is said to have performed a feasibility study recently regarding such a project on their website. A committee has been formed under the leadership of Homen Borgohain to revive the river so that transportation and irrigation projects along the river valley can be started. It has been decided that a sluice gate must be installed at the mouth of the River at Hatimora, so that the flow of the river can be controlled easily. The state government of Assam has initiated a rejuvenation program to address this issue.

== Pollution issues ==
In 2013, a Central Pollution Control Board (CPCB) report identified the Kolong River as one of 71 most polluted rivers in India. The primary reason for pollution was sewage and organic discharges from towns and communities situated along the river. The main contributors were Misa river, Diju river and Nagaon town. Two tributaries of Kolong, Haria and Gerua rivers, helped reduce contamination.
