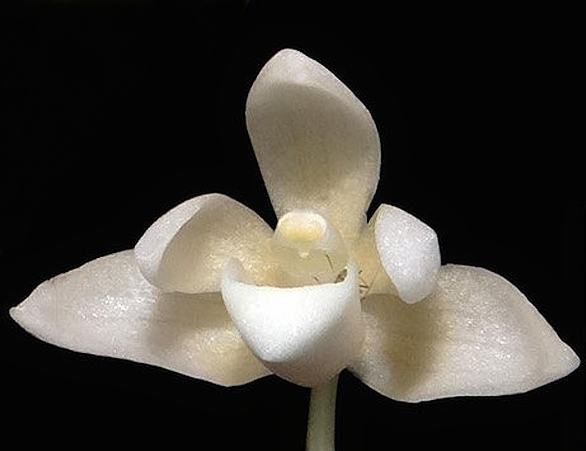
- Biermannia jainiana flower

Scientific classification
- Kingdom: Plantae
- Clade: Tracheophytes
- Clade: Angiosperms
- Clade: Monocots
- Order: Asparagales
- Family: Orchidaceae
- Subfamily: Epidendroideae
- Tribe: Vandeae
- Subtribe: Aeridinae
- Genus: Biermannia; King & Pantl.

Type species
- Biermannia quinquecallosa King & Pantl.

= Biermannia =

Genus of orchids

Biermannia is a genus of flowering plants from the orchid family, Orchidaceae. It is native to eastern India, China and Southeast Asia. Sir George King and Robert Pantling erected this genus in memory of Adolph Biermann who was the curator of Botanical garden in Kolkata.

== Species ==
The following species are accepted as of May 2014:

- Biermannia arunachalensis A.N.Rao - Arunachal Pradesh
- Biermannia bigibba (Schltr.) Garay - Sumatra
- Biermannia bimaculata (King & Pantl.) King & Pantl. - Bhutan, Assam
- Biermannia calcarata Aver. - Guangxi, Vietnam
- Biermannia ciliata (Ridl.) Garay - Thailand, Malaysia
- Biermannia flava (Carr) Garay - Pahang
- Biermannia jainiana S.N.Hegde & A.N.Rao - Arunachal Pradesh
- Biermannia laciniata (Carr) Garay - Malaysia
1. Biermannia longicheila
- Biermannia quinquecallosa King & Pantl. - Assam
- Biermannia sarcanthoides (Ridl.) Garay - Johor
- Biermannia sigaldii Seidenf. - Vietnam

== See also ==
- List of Orchidaceae genera
