= Biermannia arunachalensis =

Scientific classification
- Kingdom: Plantae
- Clade: Tracheophytes
- Clade: Angiosperms
- Clade: Monocots
- Order: Asparagales
- Family: Orchidaceae
- Subfamily: Epidendroideae
- Genus: Biermannia
- Species: B. arunachalensis

Binomial name
- Biermannia arunachalensis A.N.Rao

Species of Orchid

Biermannia arunachalensis is a species of orchid found in Arunachal Pradesh, India.

== Description ==
This is an epiphytic orchid with 1.5 cm long stem and long roots. It can have up to 4 leaves that are oblanceolate and can grow up to 5 to 7 cm. The inflorescence is 2.5 cm long and concealed by leaves. The flowers are yellow in color with sweet scent and the lip is 8 by 4 mm. It can be differentiated from the similar looking Biermannia bimaculata species by the yellow colored flowers, lip lacking callus and broad and obtuse side lobes.

== Distribution ==
This orchid species is known to occur only in Tippi village of West Kameng district of Arunachal Pradesh in India. However it was found growing on a tree planted inside the Orchid Research Centre in Tippi hence leading to a speculation that its distribution could not be confirmed.

== Ecology ==
This species was discovered as an epiphyte growing on branches of a Thuja orientalis tree in the wet evergreen subtropical forest habitat inside the Orchid Research center in Tippi. It was found flowering in April.

== Etymology ==
This species was named after the state of Arunachal Pradesh where it was discovered.

== Conservation and threats ==
As per 2022 IUCN assessment, this species has a very narrow distribution range with hardly any information beyond the known location resulting in the status as Data deficient. The tree where it was found growing is an exotic one hence leading to a thought that this species might be existing somewhere in the wild. The area surrounding the Orchid research center is unprotected and had pressures of logging, human settlement expansion and climate change impacting the habitat.
