= Arunachal Pradesh Khaw Tai rice =

Type of aromatic rice grown in India

Arunachal Pradesh Khaw Tai (Khamti Rice)
- Geographical indication
- Alternative names: Khaw Tai rice or Khamti rice
- Description: Arunachal Pradesh Khaw Tai (Khamti Rice) is an aromatic rice cultivated in Arunachal Pradesh
- Type: Aromatic rice
- Area: Namsai, Changlang, and Lohit districts
- Country: India
- Registered: 3 October 2023
- Official website: ipindia.gov.in

Arunachal Pradesh Khaw Tai (Khamti Rice) is an indigenous variety of non-Basmati, short-grained bold aromatic rice mainly grown in the Indian state of Arunachal Pradesh. It is a common and traditionally widely cultivated crop by Khampti tribe farmers in Namsai, Changlang, and Lohit districts. Under its Geographical Indication tag, it is referred to as "Arunachal Pradesh Khaw Tai (Khamti Rice)".

== Name ==
The name "Arunachal Pradesh Khaw Tai (Khamti Rice)" is made up of few terms - With "Arunachal Pradesh" referring to the state where it is cultivated; "Khaw" or "Khao" means rice in the local Khamti language; "Tai" refers to the Tai ethnic group and also Tai means heavenly; and "Khamti" refers to the Khamti ethnic tribe - the primary cultivators for this rice variety, who call themselves Tai Khampti. It is simply known as Khaw Tai rice or Khamti rice too.

== Description ==
The Khampti farmers, inhabiting the Namsai region of Arunachal Pradesh, traditionally cultivate crops. "Khampti" means "a land full of gold". Their staple food includes the chewy sticky Khaw Tai rice, which has a strong aroma, bold size, and is much healthier with many medicinal values. The sources of water for growing rice create rice environments either irrigated or rain-fed. This rice was once used by their ancestors as a protective jacket during wars and jungle expeditions, providing both protection and sustenance.

=== Cuisine ===
The Khampti people also enjoy boiled rice cakes wrapped in leaves and a simple meal of rice mixed with boiled green leafy vegetables. The Khampti's rice food recipes include Tongtep, cakes made of ground rice, Khawlam, boiled rice and sesame seeds, Paasa, fresh river fish soup with special herbs, as well as Paa-som and Nam-Som.

== Geographical indication ==
It was awarded the Geographical Indication (GI) status tag from the Geographical Indications Registry, by the Union Government of India, on 3 October 2023 and is valid until 12 December 2031.

Namsai Organic Spices and Agricultural Producer Company Limited from Lohit, proposed the GI registration of Arunachal Pradesh Khaw Tai (Khamti Rice). After filing the application in December 2021, the rice was granted the GI tag in 2023 by the Geographical Indication Registry in Chennai, making the name "Arunachal Pradesh Khaw Tai (Khamti Rice)" exclusive to the rice grown in the region. It thus became the first rice variety from Arunachal Pradesh and the 3rd type of goods from Arunachal Pradesh to earn the GI tag. The GI tag protects the rice from illegal selling and marketing, and gives it legal protection and a unique identity.
