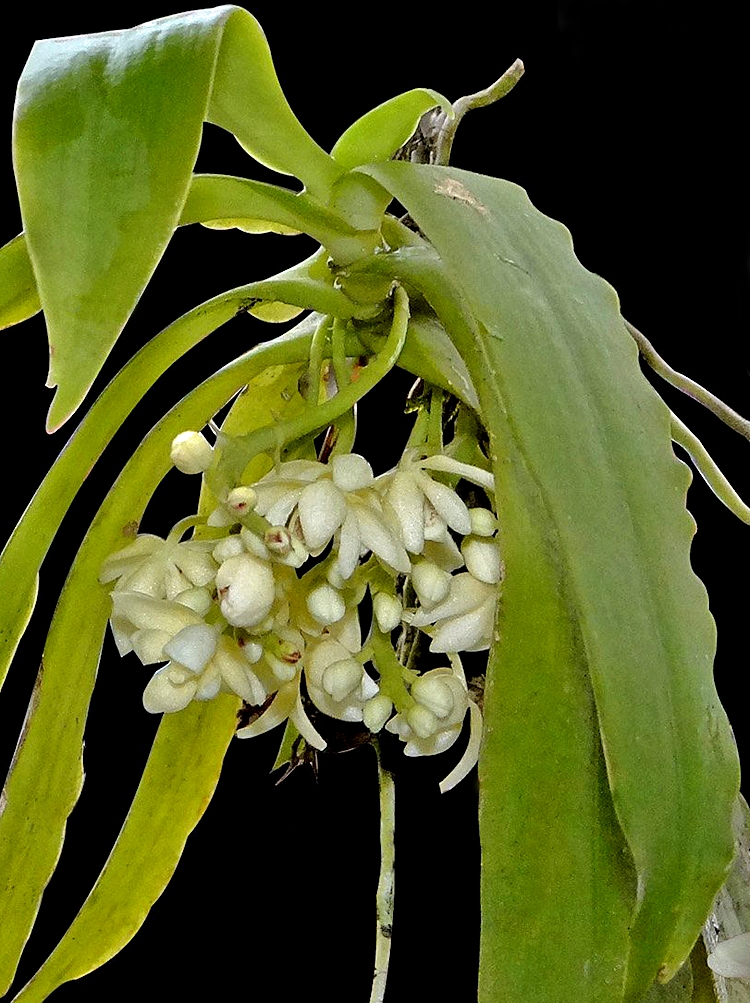

Conservation status
- Critically Endangered (IUCN 3.1)

Scientific classification
- Kingdom: Plantae
- Clade: Tracheophytes
- Clade: Angiosperms
- Clade: Monocots
- Order: Asparagales
- Family: Orchidaceae
- Subfamily: Epidendroideae
- Genus: Biermannia
- Species: B. jainiana

Binomial name
- Biermannia jainiana S.N.Hegde & A.N.Rao

= Biermannia jainiana =

Species of orchid

Biermannia jainiana is a critically endangered species of orchid found only in Arunachal Pradesh of India.

== Description ==
This orchid is an epiphyte with a 4 to 7 cm stem with many roots. The leaves are 6 to 15 cm long and 1.2 to 2.5 cm wide and can be 8 in numbers. The flowers are raceme and 2 to 6 individuals and can be 3 to 6 cm long. The flowers are white and sepals have a pale yellow base. The lip is white with brown hairs inside and the petals have 3 nerves.

== Distribution ==
This species is known only from forests near Sessa orchid sanctuary in West Kameng district of Arunachal Pradesh.

== Etymology ==
This orchid was named in honor of S.K.Jain director of Botanical Survey of India.

== Ecology ==
It was recorded from dense evergreen moist forests around 1200 meters elevation. This orchid is an epiphyte found growing on trunks of Schima wallichii and Toona ciliata trees. It flowers and fruits between March and April.

== Conservation and threats ==
In a 2018 survey, only 10 mature individuals were found in an area less than 10 km^{2} at the buffer zone of Sessa Wildlife sanctuary making it vulnerable to illegal logging of its host trees.
