= Kane Wildlife Sanctuary =

Protected area in Arunachal Pradesh, India

- IUCN category IV (habitat/species management area)
- Location within Arunachal Pradesh Location within India
- Interactive map of Kane Wildlife Sanctuary
- Nearest city: Along
- Coordinates: 27°40′00″N 94°39′00″E
- Area: 31 km^{2} (12 sq mi)
- Established: 1991

Kane Wildlife Sanctuary is a protected area and wildlife sanctuary located in West Siang district of the Indian state of Arunachal Pradesh. The sanctuary covers an area of 31 km^{2} (12 sq mi) and was declared as a protected area in 1991.

The protected area consists of a mixture of tropical evergreen and temperate broad leaf mixed forests. The fauna found in the sanctuary include Indian elephant, Bengal tiger, gaur, Asiatic black bear, slow loris, rhesus macaque, capped langur, Himalayan serow, mouse deer, and antelopes. There are more than 70 species of bird including white-bellied heron, white-winged duck, rufous-necked hornbill, dark-rumped swift, beautiful sibia, and broad-billed warbler. Reptiles include the king cobra, Indian python, and reticulated python.
