= Sonai Rupai Wildlife Sanctuary =

Protected area in Assam, India

- IUCN category IV (habitat/species management area)
- Location within Assam Location within India
- Interactive map of Sonai Rupai Wildlife Sanctuary
- Location: Assam, India
- Nearest city: Tezpur
- Coordinates: 26°53′39″N 92°20′45″E
- Area: 175 km^{2} (68 sq mi)
- Established: 1998; 28 years ago
- Governing body: Department of Environment & Forests, Assam

Sonai Rupai Wildlife Sanctuary is a protected area located in the state of Assam in India. This wildlife sanctuary covers 175 km^{2}. It is located along the foothills of the Great Himalayan Range. The area was declared as a sanctuary in 1998. It is located 52 km from Tezpur town and 193 km away from Guwahati. Four rivers flow through the sanctuary: Gabharu, Gelgeli, Sonai and Rupai.

== Biodiversity ==
Mammals: tiger, Asian elephant, gaur, wild boar, pygmy hog, barasingha and barking deer. Birds: white winged wood duck, hornbill, pelican, and various migratory birds. Reptiles: python, Russell's viper.

== See also ==
- Kameng Elephant Reserve
