= Pakke Tiger Reserve =

Tiger reserve in Arunachal Pradesh, India

- IUCN category IV (habitat/species management area)
- Location within Arunachal Pradesh Location within India
- Interactive map of Pakke Tiger Reserve
- Nearest city: Rangapara
- Coordinates: 27°05′N 92°51.5′E
- Area: 861.95 km^{2} (332.80 sq mi)
- Max. elevation: 2040
- Established: 1966
- Governing body: Ministry of Environment & Forest of the Government of Arunachal Pradesh
- Website: projecttiger.nic.in/Ntcamap/108_1_4_mapdetails.aspx

Pakke Tiger Reserve is a Project Tiger reserve in the East Kameng district of Arunachal Pradesh in Northeast India. The 862 km^{2} (333 sq mi) reserve is managed by the Department of Environment and Forests, Arunachal Pradesh. It was known as Pakhui Tiger Reserve, but renamed in April 2001 by the Governor of Arunachal Pradesh. It has won India Biodiversity Award 2016 in the category of 'Conservation of threatened species' for its Hornbill Nest Adoption Programme.

== Location ==
Pakke Wildlife Sanctuary lies in the undulating and hilly foothills of the Eastern Himalayas in Arunachal Pradesh's Pakke Kessang District at elevations ranging from 150 to 2,000 m (490 to 6,560 ft). It is bounded by Bhareli or Kameng River in the west and north, and by Pakke River in the east. It is surrounded by contiguous forests on most sides. To the east lies Papum Reserve Forest with an area of 1,064 km^{2} (411 mi^{2}). Towards the south and south-east, the sanctuary adjoins reserve forests and Assam's Nameri National Park. To the west, it is bounded by Doimara Reserve Forest with an area of 216 km^{2} (83 mi^{2}) and Eaglenest Wildlife Sanctuary; and to the north by Shergaon Forest Division.

The main perennial streams in the area are the Nameri, Khari and Upper Dikorai. West of Kameng River are Sessa Orchid Sanctuary and Eaglenest Wildlife Sanctuary.

== History ==
The area of Pakke Tiger Reserve was initially constituted as Pakhui Reserve Forest on 1 July 1966 and declared a game reserve on 28 March 1977. In 2001, it was renamed Pakhui Wildlife Sanctuary and became Pakhui Tiger Reserve on 23 April 2002 as the 26th Tiger Reserve under Project Tiger of the National Tiger Conservation Authority.

== Geography ==
The reserves elevations range from 100 to 2,000 m (330 to 6,560 ft) above msl. The terrain is rugged with mountainous ranges in the north and narrow plains and sloping hill valleys in the south. The sanctuary slopes southwards towards the river valley of the Brahmaputra River. The area of Brahmaputra and Chittagong Hills, which includes Pakke and Namdapha Tiger Reserve, is the north-western limit of the Indochinese tiger's range, bordering the eastern limit of the Bengal tiger's range.

== Climate ==
Pakke Tiger Reserve has a subtropical climate with cold weather from November to March. The temperature varies from 12 to 36 °C (54 to 97 °F). Annual rainfall is 2,500 millimetres (98 in). It receives rainfall predominantly from the south-west monsoon in May to September and north-east monsoon from November to April. October and November are relatively dry. Winds are generally of moderate velocity. Thunderstorms occasionally occur in March–April. The average annual rainfall is 2500 mm. May and June are the hottest months. Humidity levels reach 80% during the summer.

== Flora ==
The habitat types are lowland semi-evergreen, evergreen forest and Eastern Himalayan broadleaf forests. A total of 343 woody species of flowering plants (angiosperms) have been recorded from the lowland areas of the park, with a high representation of species from the families Euphorbiaceae and Lauraceae, but at least 1500 species of vascular plants are expected from Pakhui WLS, of which 500 species would be woody. While about 600 species of orchids are reported from Arunachal Pradesh, Pakhui WLS and adjoining areas also harbour many orchid species. The forest has a typical layered structure and the major emergent species are bhelu Tetrameles nudiflora, borpat Ailanthus grandis and jutuli Altingia excelsa.

The general vegetation type of the entire tract is classified as Assam Valley tropical semi-evergreen forest. The forests are multi-storeyed and rich in epiphytic flora and woody lianas. The vegetation is dense, with a high diversity and density of woody lianas and climbers. The forest types include tropical semi-evergreen forests along the lower plains and foothills dominated by kari Polyalthia simiarum, hatipehala Pterospermum acerifolium, karibadam Sterculia alata, paroli Stereospermum chelonoides, Ailanthus grandis and khokun Duabanga grandiflora. The tropical semi-evergreen forests are scattered along the lower plains and foothills, dominated by Altingia excelsa, nahar Mesua ferrea, banderdima Dysoxylum binectariferum, Beilschmedia sp. and other middle storey trees belonging to the Lauraceae and Myrtaceae. These forests have a large number of species of economic value. Subtropical broadleaved forests of the Fagaceae and Lauraceae dominate the hill tops and higher reaches. Moist areas near streams have a profuse growth of bamboo, cane and palms. About eight species of bamboo occur in the area, in moist areas in gullies, in areas previously under settlements, or subjected to some form of disturbance on the hill slopes. At least five commercially important cane species grow in moist areas, along with tokko Livistona jenkinsiana, a species used extensively by locals for thatching roofs. Along the larger perennial streams, there are shingle beds with patches of tall grassland, which give way to lowland moist forests with outenga Dillenia indica and boromthuri Talauma hodgsonii. Along the larger rivers, isolated trees of semal Bombax ceiba and two species of koroi Albizzia sp. are common.

These forests have a high percentage of tree species (64%) that are animal-dispersed, with 12% tree species being wind-dispersed.

== Fauna ==
At least 40 mammal species occur in Pakke Tiger Reserve, including the tiger, leopard, clouded leopard, jungle cat, dhole, golden jackal, Himalayan black bear, binturong, Asian elephant, gaur, sambar, hog deer, northern red muntjac, wild boar, yellow-throated marten, Malayan giant squirrel, flying squirrel, squirrel, capped langur, rhesus macaque, Assam macaque. The presence of stamp tailed macaques has been reported by one researcher.

At least 296 bird species have been recorded from PTR including the globally endangered white-winged wood duck, the unique ibisbill, and the rare Oriental bay owl. PTR is a good place to see hornbills. Roost sites of wreathed hornbills and great hornbill can be observed on the river banks. Birds seen in Pakke Tiger Reserve include: Jerdon's baza, pied falconet, white-cheeked hill-partridge, grey peacock-pheasant, elwe's crake, ibisbill, Asian emerald cuckoo, red-headed trogon, green pigeon, forest eagle owl, wreathed hornbill, great hornbill and long-tailed broadbill, blue-naped pitta, lesser shortwing, Himalayan shortwing, Daurian redstart, lesser necklaced laughing-thrush, silver-eared mesia, white-bellied yuhina, yellow-bellied flycatcher, sultan tit, ruby-cheeked sunbird, maroon oriole, and crow-billed drongo.

== Park protection ==
Presently, there are 27 anti-poaching camps where 104 local youth and 20 gaon buras (village fathers) have been employed as forest watchers. A 41 km (25 mi) road has been constructed to ease logistics and deter poachers. The people living around the park belong to the Nyishi community. The Ghora Aabhe (a group of village chiefs) and Women Self Help Groups help authorities in wildlife protection by providing information and enforcing customary laws. The Nyishi community has joined hands with civil society and the forest department to protect hornbill nests. The Nyishi tribe uses fiber glass replicas of hornbills beaks as their headgear and has fines for hunting of tigers, among other regulations.

The Ghora Aabhe Society (a group of village chiefs) was formed in 2006. A group of 12 village heads, along with the forest department, supports conservation efforts around Pakhui Tiger Reserve (PTR). Their work has been widely recognised, through several awards and articles in print media. The Ghora Aabhe enforce customary laws, institute penalties against hunting and logging, aid in capacity building and spread awareness of PTR.

== See also ==
- Wildlife of India
