= Diju River =

River in India

- Location within Assam Location within India

Location
- State: Assam
- District: Karbi Anglong district & Nagaon district

Physical characteristics
- Source: Hills of Karbi Anglong
  - location: Karbi Anglong district, Assam
  - coordinates: 26°30′00.8″N 93°08′00.1″E
- Mouth: Kolong River
  - location: Near Amoni village, Nagaon district, Assam
  - coordinates: 26°26′40.0″N 92°53′20.6″E

Basin features
- Progression: Diju River -Kolong River- Brahmaputra River

The Diju River is a sub- tributary of the Brahmaputra River in the Indian state of Assam.

== Geography ==
Diju river originates in the hills of Karbi Anglong district and flows through the Karbi Anglong district and Nagaon district. Diju river meets Kolong River near at Amoni village of Nagaon district. Fed by the water from the Diju, the Kolong River becomes bigger and finally meets Brahmaputra River.
