= Parshuram Kund =

Hindu Pilgrimage Site in Arunachal Pradesh

- परशुराम कुंड
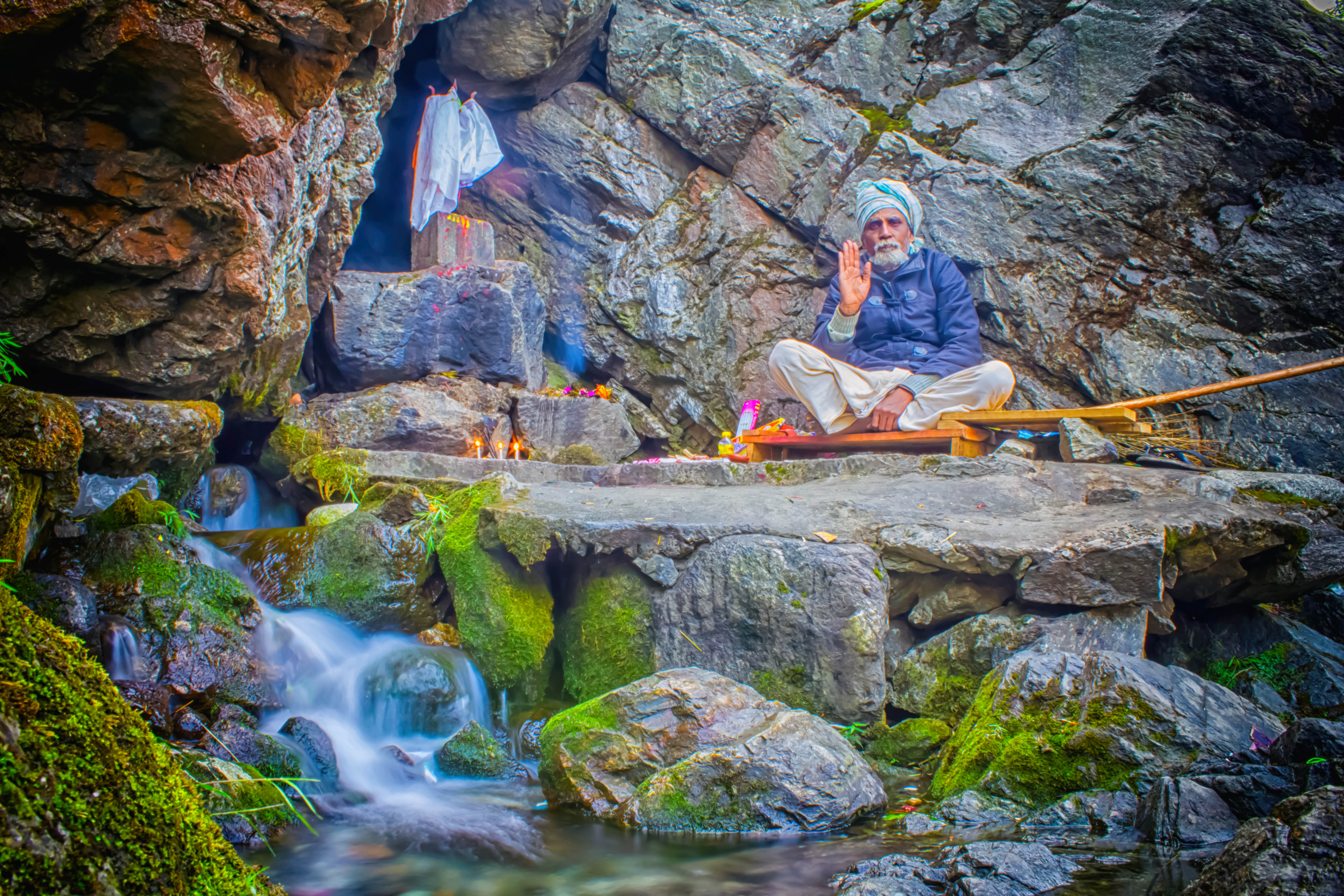

- Location in Arunachal Pradesh

Religion
- Affiliation: Hinduism
- District: Lohit district
- Deity: Parashurama
- Festival: Makar Sankranti

Location
- State: Arunachal Pradesh
- Country: India
- Coordinates: 27°52′39″N 96°21′33″E

Parshuram Kund is a Hindu pilgrimage site in the Lohit district of Arunachal Pradesh, India. It is situated on the Brahmaputra plateau in the lower reaches of the Lohit River and about 48 km from Tezu in Lohit district of Arunachal Pradesh, India. Dedicated to the sage Parashurama, the popular site attracts pilgrims from Nepal, from across India, including the nearby states of Manipur and Assam. Over 70,000 devotees and sadhus take a holy dip in its water each year on the occasion of Makar Sankranti, in the month of January.

== History ==
The site of the Parashuram Kund as established by the Sadhu was in existence until the 1950 Assam earthquake that shook the whole of the North-East and the Kund was completely covered. A very strong current is now flowing over the original site of the Kund, but massive boulders have in a mysterious way embedded themselves in a circular formation in the riverbed thus forming another Kund in place of the old.

== Gallery ==
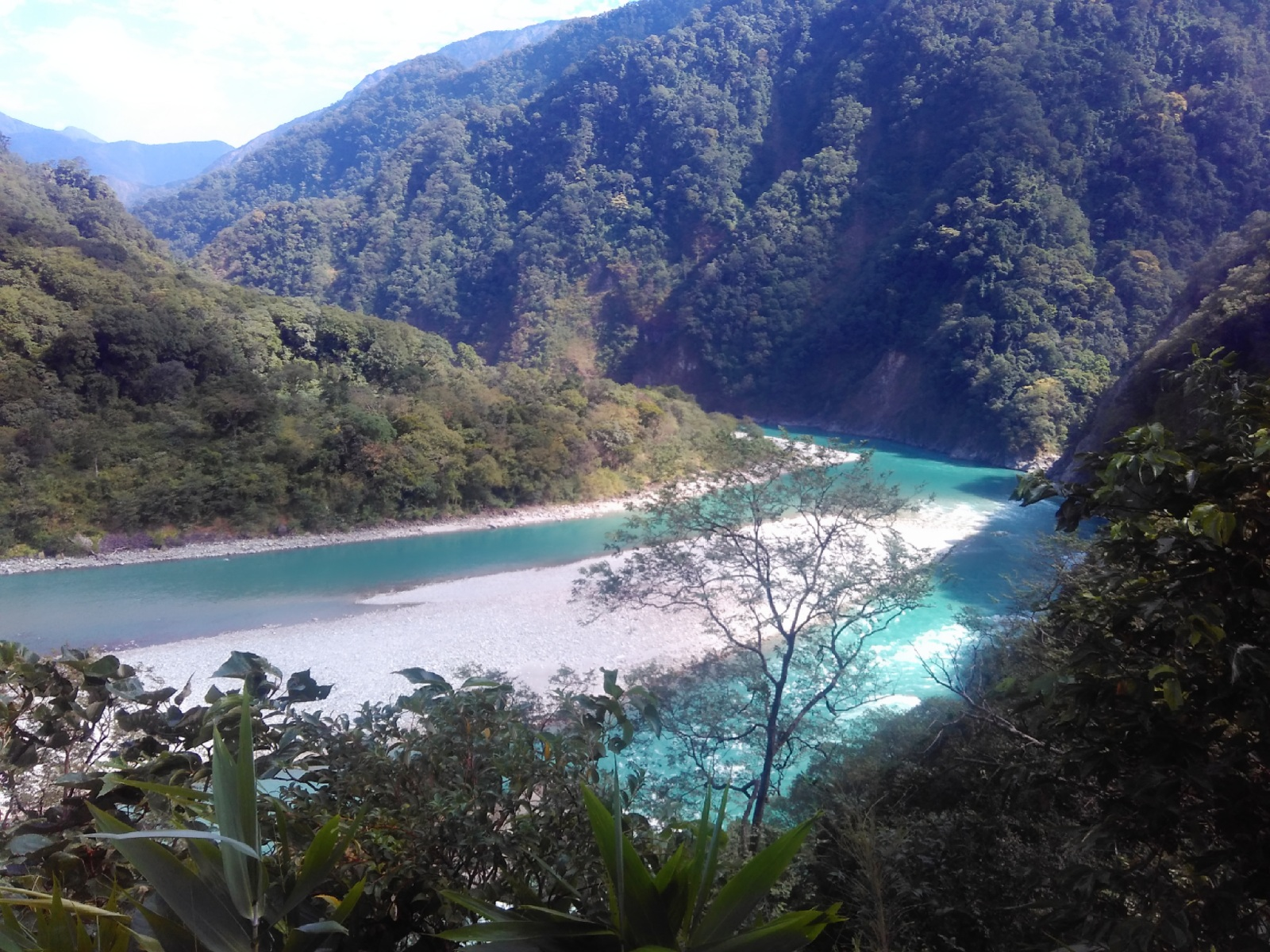
Parshuram Math (view 1)

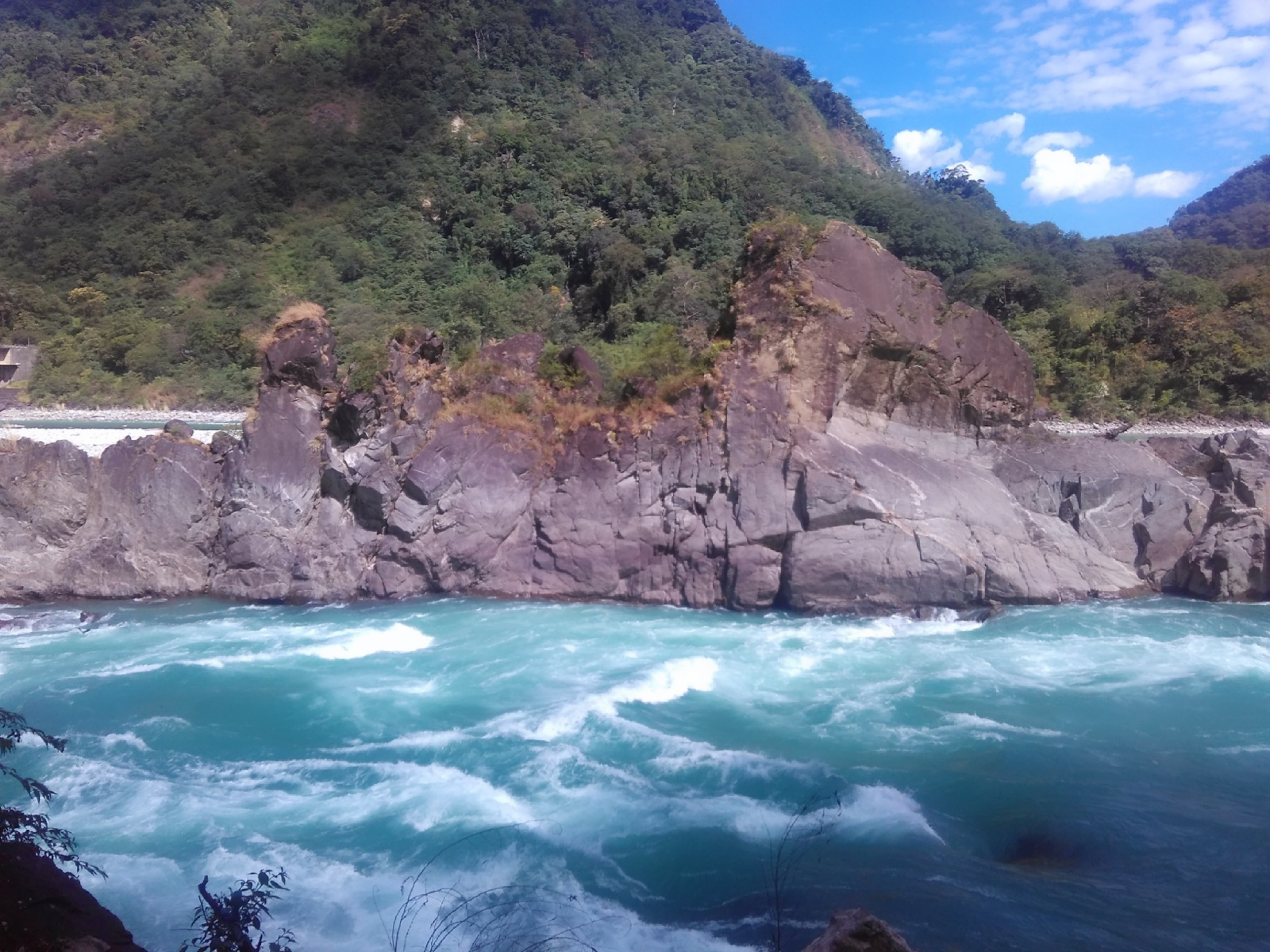
Parshuram Math (view 2)

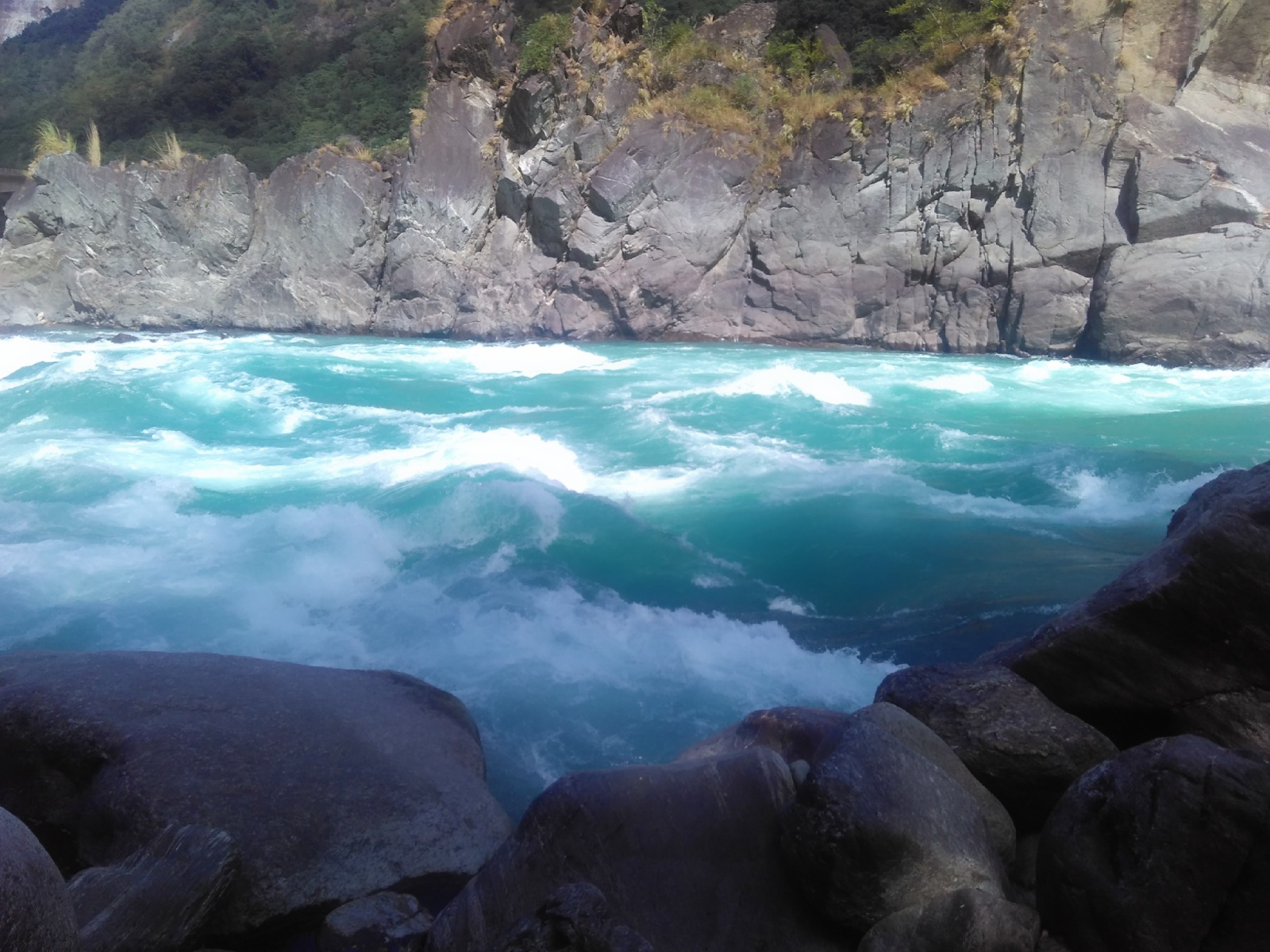
Parshuram Math (view 3)

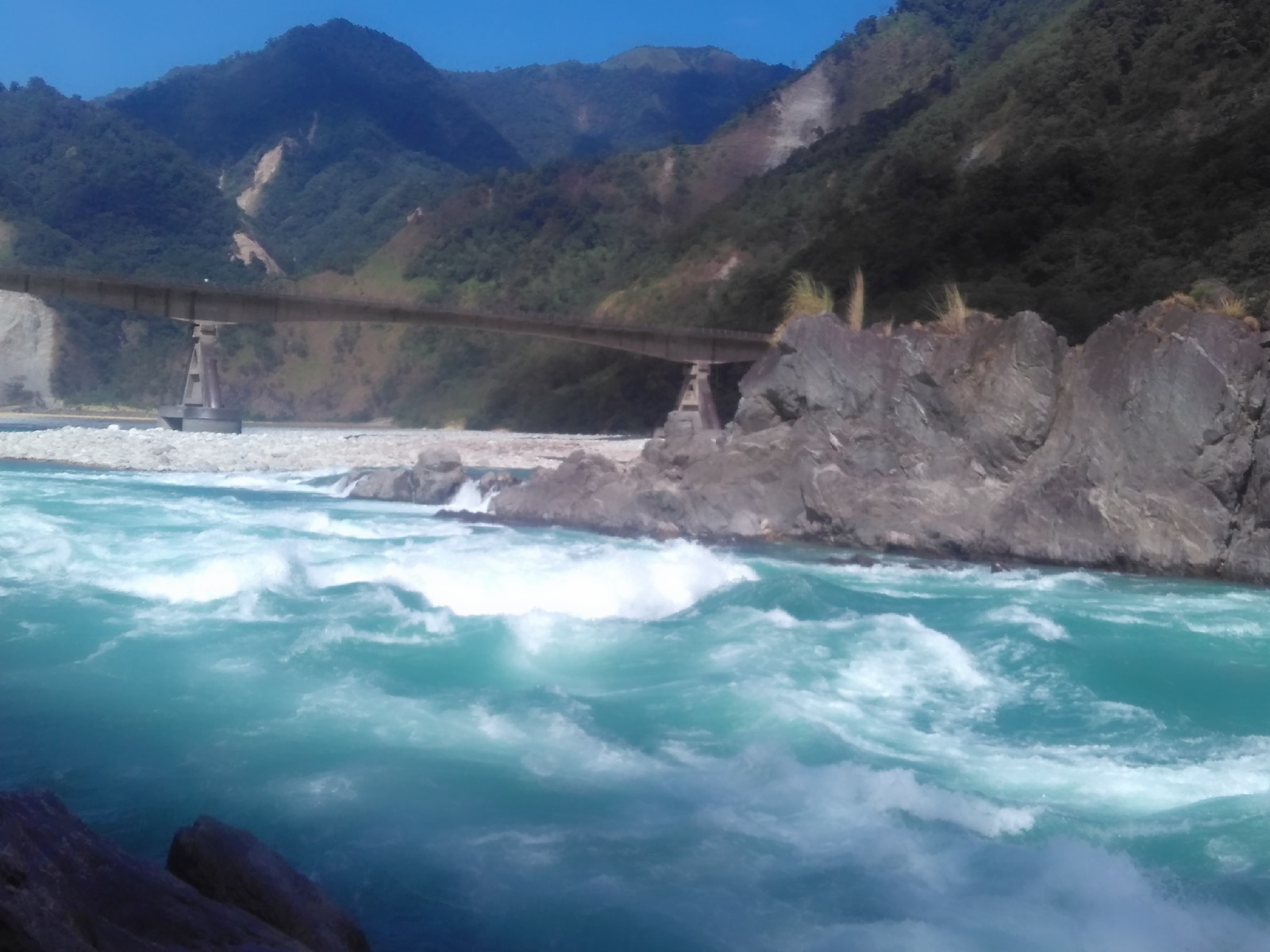
Parshuram Math (view 4)

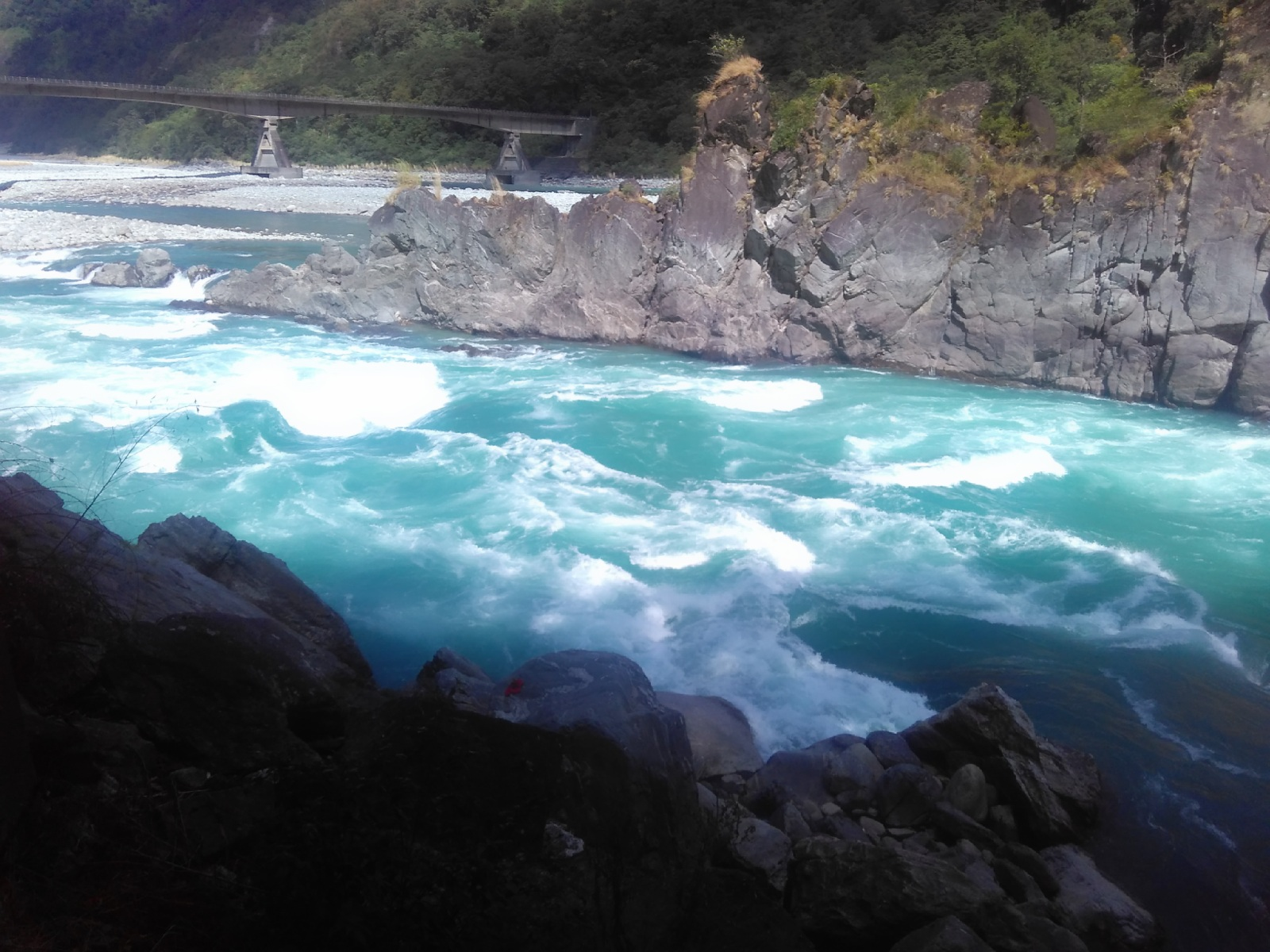
Parshuram Math (view 5)

== See also ==
- Parasurameswara Temple - Called Gudimallam, an ancient temple from 2nd Century
- Hinduism in Arunachal Pradesh
