= Kamlang Wildlife Sanctuary =

Indian Natural Park

- IUCN category IV (habitat/species management area)
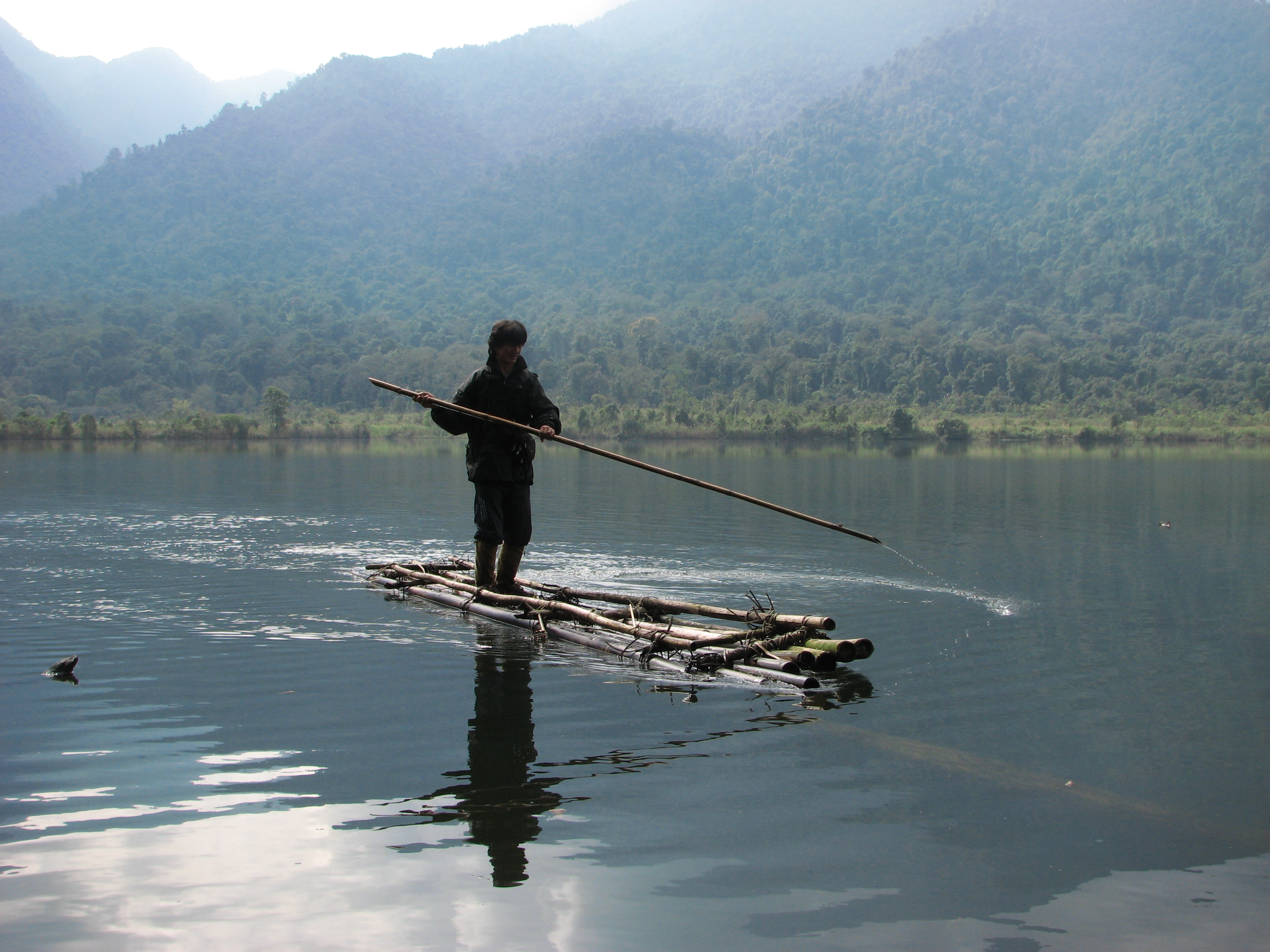
- Glow Lake in Kamlang Wildlife Sanctuary

- Location within Arunachal Pradesh Location within India
- Interactive map of Kamlang Wildlife Sanctuary
- Location: Lohit District, Arunachal Pradesh, India
- Nearest town: Wakro
- Coordinates: 27°40′00″N 96°26′00″E
- Area: 783 km^{2} (302 sq mi)
- Established: 1974; 52 years ago
- Governing body: Government of India, Government of Arunachal Pradesh

Kamlang Wildlife Sanctuary is a wildlife sanctuary in the Indian state of Arunachal Pradesh. It was established in 1989 and is the 50th tiger reserve of India. In 2024, it was declared as a eco-sensitive zone. It is rich with floral and faunal diversity. It is situated in the Lohit District. The park is named after the Kamlang River which flows through it. The Mishmi, Digaro Mishmi, and Miju Mishmi people tribal people who reside around the periphery of the sanctuary claim their descent from the King Rukmo of the epic Mahabharata. They believe in a myth of an invisible god known as Suto Phenkhenynon jamalu. An important body of water in the sanctuary is the Glow Lake. Located in tropical and sub-tropical climatic zones, the sanctuary is the habitat of the Bengal tiger, leopard, clouded leopard and snow leopard.

== Geography ==
Kamlang Wildlife Sanctuary is one of the twelve protected areas in the state of Arunachal Pradesh. It was established in 1989 and covers an area of 783 km^{2} (302 sq mi) in the south-eastern part of Lohit district. The Lang River forms its northern border and the Namdapha National Park is on its southern border.

== Flora ==
The upper reaches of the park have Alpine vegetation, particularly on the Daphabum peak which borders the Namdapha National Park. The lower reaches (below 1,200 metres (3,900 ft)), including the foothills, have tropical wet evergreen forests. 150 tree species have been reported in the park. The main trees found in the park are Canarium resiniferum, Terminalia chebula, Gmelina arborea and Amoora wallichii. A great variety of herbs, bamboos, grasses, and shrubs are also present, and 49 species of orchids have also been reported from the park.

== Fauna ==
Faunal diversity in the park is somewhat similar to that found in the contiguous area of the Namdapha Tiger Reserve; there are 61 species of mammals, 105 bird species and 20 species of reptiles. The cat species of the wildlife sanctuary includes the Royal Bengal tiger, common leopard, clouded leopard, marbled cat, leopard cat and snow leopard. Other notable animal species reported in the park are Asian elephant, wild boar, sambar, barking deer, black giant squirrel and some flying squirrels. Of the fifteen species of primate found in India, six species are found in the park. These are capped langur (Trachypithecus pileatus), rhesus macaque (Macaca mulatta), stump-tailed macaque (Macaca arctoides), Assamese macaque (Macaca assamensis), eastern hoolock gibbon (hoolock leuconedys), and Bengal slow loris (Nycticebus bengalensis).

== Glaw Lake ==
Designations

Ramsar Wetland
- Designated: 21 January 2026
- Reference no.: 2597

Kamlang Wildlife Sanctuary contains the Glaw Lake, also spelled Glow Lake, locally Glaw Tuli and Glaw Hawai, in its core zone at an elevation of 1,500 m (5,000 ft) with a surface area of 8 km^{2} (3.1 sq mi) and a circumference of about 4–5 km (2.5–3.1 mi). On 21 January 2026, the lake was designated as a Ramsar Site by the Ramsar Convention. The designation was officially announced on 3 August 2026 by the Ministry of Environment, Forest and Climate Change as India's 101st Ramsar Site and Arunachal Pradesh's first Ramsar Site. The designation highlights the lake's global importance for wetland conservation, water security, climate resilience and ecological sustainability.
