= Sessa Orchid Sanctuary =

Protected area in West Kameng, Arunachal Pradesh, India

- IUCN category IV (habitat/species management area)
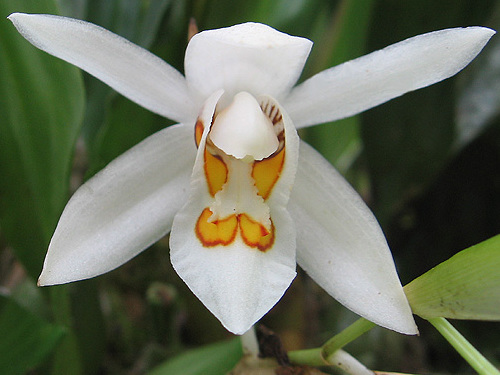
- Coelogyne nitida

- Location within Arunachal Pradesh Location within India
- Interactive map of Sessa Orchid Sanctuary
- Location: West Kameng, Arunachal Pradesh, India
- Coordinates: 27.2°N 92.5°E
- Area: 100 km^{2} (39 sq mi)
- Established: 1989

Sessa Orchid Sanctuary is a 100-km^{2} protected area of India in the Himalayan foothills in Bhalukpong Forest Division of West Kameng District, Arunachal Pradesh. It conjoins Eaglenest Wildlife Sanctuary to the southwest. It is a part of the Kameng Protected Area Complex (KPAC), which is an elephant reserve. The Environment & Forests Department has developed trekking routes for visitors to enjoy the natural habitats of orchids. There are deep gorges and valleys, high peaks and rugged terrain that are rewarding for nature lovers and adventure tourists. A nursery includes representative specimens of various orchid species of the sanctuary and a demonstration farm of Cymbidium hybrids for cut-flower production. Most of Sessa has traditionally been claimed by the Bugun tribe as part of their territory.

== Geography and climate ==
Sessa and Eaglenest together occupy a rough east–west rectangle with Sessa occupying the north-east quadrant. The Bhalukpong-Bomdila highway (and Pakke immediately beyond) are its eastern boundary. It is bounded to the north by the Tenga River valley. Altitude is 900 metres (2,953 ft) to 3,250 metres (10,663 ft).

Sessa and Eaglenest ridges rise to 3,250 metres (10,663 ft) and 2,700 metres (8,858 ft) respectively and are the first major barriers to the monsoon as it moves north from the plains of Assam. These ridges get over 3,000 millimetres (120 in) of rain on the southern slopes and about 1,500 millimetres (59 in) on the northern slopes.

Sessa sanctuary is drained by the Tippi Naala (Tippi river), which joins the Kameng river at Tippi village on the Bhalukpong-Bomdila highway.

Sessa is part of the Kameng protected area complex (KPAC), the largest contiguous closed-canopy forest tract of Arunachal Pradesh, which includes Sessa, Eaglenest, Pakke, Nameri, and Sonai Rupai sanctuaries and associated reserved forest blocks. The Complex covers 3500 km^{3} in area and ranges from 100 metres (328 ft) to 3,300 metres (10,827 ft) in altitude.

== Orchids ==
Sessa is noted for the occurrence of more than 200 orchid species with 5 new and endemic species. Sub-tropical types include the genera Dendrobium, Bulbophyllum, Coelogyne, Eria, Phaius and Liparis. The sanctuary is unique in having 7 endemic species of saprotrophic orchids. 12 rare species of different families were found in one study of the area.

== Orchid Research and Development Centre ==
The Government of Arunachal Pradesh in the late 1970s created a post of orchidologist in the Forest Department and in 1989 established the Orchid Research and Development Centre (ORDC) at Tipi, and the Sessa Orchid Sanctuary 20 km way. The ORDC is actively engaged in exploration and collection of orchid species, cultivation in orchidaria and gardens for their taxonomic study, conservation of rare and endangered species, creation of germplasm collections and multiplication of rare species through tissue culture techniques. The ORDC discovered the following species: Biermannia jainiana, Cleistoma tricallosum, Dendrobium kentrophyllum, Epipogium sessanum, Eria jengingensis, Eria lohitensis, Gastrodia arunachalenisis and Herminium longilonbatum.

== Conservation ==
The Critical Ecosystem Partnership Fund (CEPF), a consortium of major international and regional organizations, has identified the Eastern Himalayan region around Arunachal Pradesh (Nepal, Bhutan and all of North-East India) as a critical global biodiversity rich area deserving of conservation focus. They identified the North-Bank Landscape (i.e. north bank of Brahmaputra, extending up the Eaglenest and Sessa slopes) and the Tawang region as worthy of particular focus.

Sessa is within the Conservation International Himalaya Biodiversity Hotspot area.

BirdLife International has designated Sessa and Eaglenest Sanctuaries as an Important Bird Area (IBA IN344), with Blyth's tragopan identified as a vulnerable species of the area.

== Visitor information ==
Visitors may contact the DFO Pakke WLS Division, Seijosa, East Kameng District or The Range Officer (WL), Sessa Orchid Sanctuary, Sessa, West Kameng District or the Asst. Orchidologist, Tipi Orchid Center, Tipi, West Kameng District.
