= Tezu =

- Town
- Location in Arunachal Pradesh, India Tezu (India)
- Coordinates: 27.92°N 96.17°E
- Country: India
- State: Arunachal Pradesh
- District: Lohit
- Established: 1946

Government
  - Type: Democratic
  - Body: Bharatiya Janata Party ( as per 2024)
  - Rank: 5th after Aalo, Pasighat, naharlagun, Itanagar
- Elevation: 185 m (607 ft)

Population (2011)
  - Total: 18,184
  - Rank: 5th
  - Density: 17/km^{2} (44/sq mi)
- Time zone: UTC+5:30 (IST)
- Postal code: 792001
- ISO 3166 code: IN-AR
- Vehicle registration: AR-11

Tezu is a census town and the headquarters of Lohit district in the Indian state of Arunachal Pradesh. It is the fifth largest town in Arunachal Pradesh and one of its most developed.

Tezu is one of the 60 constituencies of Legislative Assembly of Arunachal Pradesh. The current MLA (2024) of Tezu constituency is Mahesh Chai, who defeated NPEP'S Karikho Kri with 2805 votes in the 2024 general election.

The town is known for its plain lands, dense forested areas, riverine and gorging rivers. Due to its close proximity to the hilly areas of Mishmi Hills, The town also serves as the main logistical hub for the transportation of goods and commuter to Anjaw district.

== Geography ==
It has an average elevation of 185 metres (606 feet). It is situated on the bank of River Lohit.

== Agriculture ==
The major agricultural products are mustard, ginger and oranges.

== Climate ==
Climate data for Tezu (1961–1990, extremes 1969–1992)
Month	Jan	Feb	Mar	Apr	May	Jun	Jul	Aug	Sep	Oct	Nov	Dec	Year
Record high °C (°F)	31.8 (89.2)	30.3 (86.5)	35.5 (95.9)	36.1 (97.0)	40.0 (104.0)	40.0 (104.0)	38.9 (102.0)	38.3 (100.9)	39.7 (103.5)	40.5 (104.9)	34.1 (93.4)	30.1 (86.2)	40.5 (104.9)
Mean daily maximum °C (°F)	23.2 (73.8)	23.6 (74.5)	26.6 (79.9)	27.8 (82.0)	30.5 (86.9)	31.9 (89.4)	31.6 (88.9)	32.9 (91.2)	32.1 (89.8)	31.0 (87.8)	27.9 (82.2)	24.8 (76.6)	28.7 (83.7)
Daily mean °C (°F)	14.7 (58.5)	16.2 (61.2)	19.6 (67.3)	21.8 (71.2)	25.2 (77.4)	26.8 (80.2)	26.6 (79.9)	27.3 (81.1)	26.4 (79.5)	25.1 (77.2)	21.0 (69.8)	16.4 (61.5)	22.3 (72.1)
Mean daily minimum °C (°F)	7.5 (45.5)	10.4 (50.7)	13.9 (57.0)	16.5 (61.7)	19.5 (67.1)	22.7 (72.9)	23.3 (73.9)	23.5 (74.3)	22.6 (72.7)	19.3 (66.7)	13.3 (55.9)	8.6 (47.5)	16.8 (62.2)
Record low °C (°F)	1.1 (34.0)	1.2 (34.2)	7.1 (44.8)	6.9 (44.4)	9.9 (49.8)	17.1 (62.8)	17.1 (62.8)	19.3 (66.7)	18.9 (66.0)	7.5 (45.5)	3.5 (38.3)	0.6 (33.1)	0.6 (33.1)
Average rainfall mm (inches)	46.3 (1.82)	76.0 (2.99)	144.3 (5.68)	326.0 (12.83)	290.9 (11.45)	462.9 (18.22)	710.7 (27.98)	429.5 (16.91)	343.9 (13.54)	181.5 (7.15)	20.0 (0.79)	31.3 (1.23)	3,063.3 (120.60)
Average rainy days	4.3	6.8	9.6	13.7	13.7	17.4	20.1	14.5	12.5	6.8	2.1	2.5	124.0
Average relative humidity (%)	81	80	75	77	78	83	87	84	83	76	73	77	80
Source: India Meteorological Department

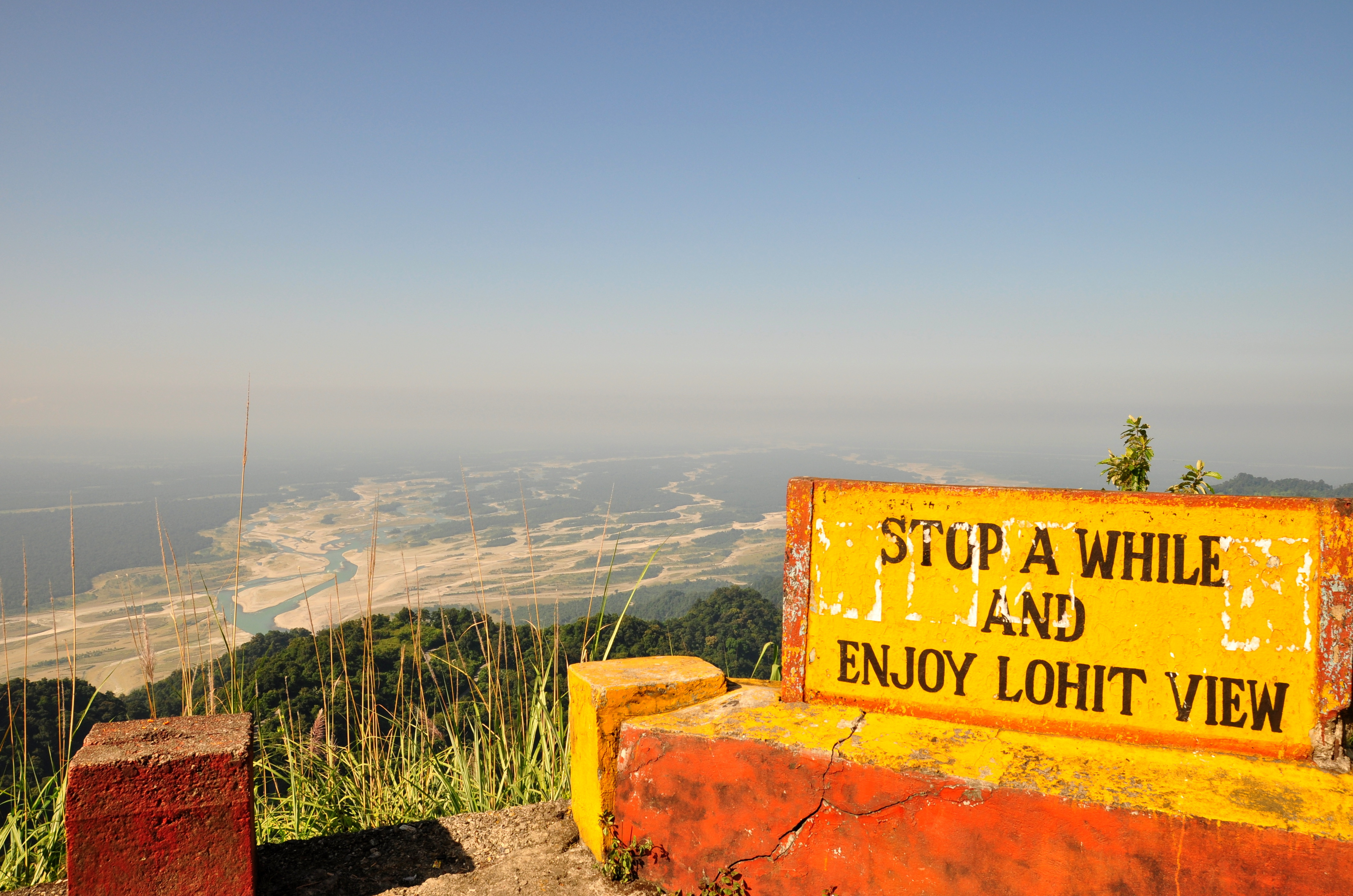
Lohit View

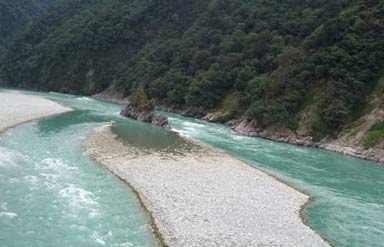
Parshuram Kund

== Transport ==
The recently constructed airport at Tezu will be the first civilian airport of Arunachal Pradesh. On Sep 22, 2017 the first successful test flight was conducted. Other nearest airports are at Mohanbari (154 km) and Guwahati (Lokpriya Gopinath Bordoloi International Airport). Tezu is linked with the adjacent state Assam by road. Arunachal Pradesh State Transport Services (APSTS) and other privately owned vehicles provide seamless connectivity to Assam. Most of the vehicles provide connectivity to Tinsukia, Assam. The nearest railway station is at Tinsukia (NTSK) which is linked to major parts of country like Guwahati, Delhi, Kolkata, Bangalore, etc.

227 km Murkongselek-Pasighat-Tezu-Rupai line is being undertaken as a strategic project. As part of this project, a proposal to connect Tezu through broad-gauge line from Murkongselek via Pasighat and extending up to Parshuram Kund was made. A preliminary engineering-traffic survey for this track has been completed, and land is being acquired as of 2020.

The newly constructed Lohit Bridge (2.9 KM) over the Lohit River at Alobarighat has also eased the connectivity of Tezu and other nearby towns with Assam. This bridge has helped Tezu in getting directly connected to Guwahati through bus service.

The strategic 2 lane Dr. Bhupen Hazarika Setu or Dhola-Sadiya bridge (9.15 KM) on Brahmaputra, which has reduced travel time between Assam and Arunachal Pradesh by four hours, has been operational since May 26, 2017. It is very crucial for defence purposes and is the longest river bridge in India.

== Demographics ==
As per 2011 Indian census, Tezu had a population of 49.776 of which 26.365 are males while 23.441 are females . Tezu has an average literacy rate of 83.98%, higher than the state average of 65.38% and national average of 74.04%. Male literacy rate is around 88.29%, and female literacy rate is 78.94%. The female sex ratio is 866 against state average of 938. Moreover, child sex ratio in Tezu is around 968 compared to the state average of 972.

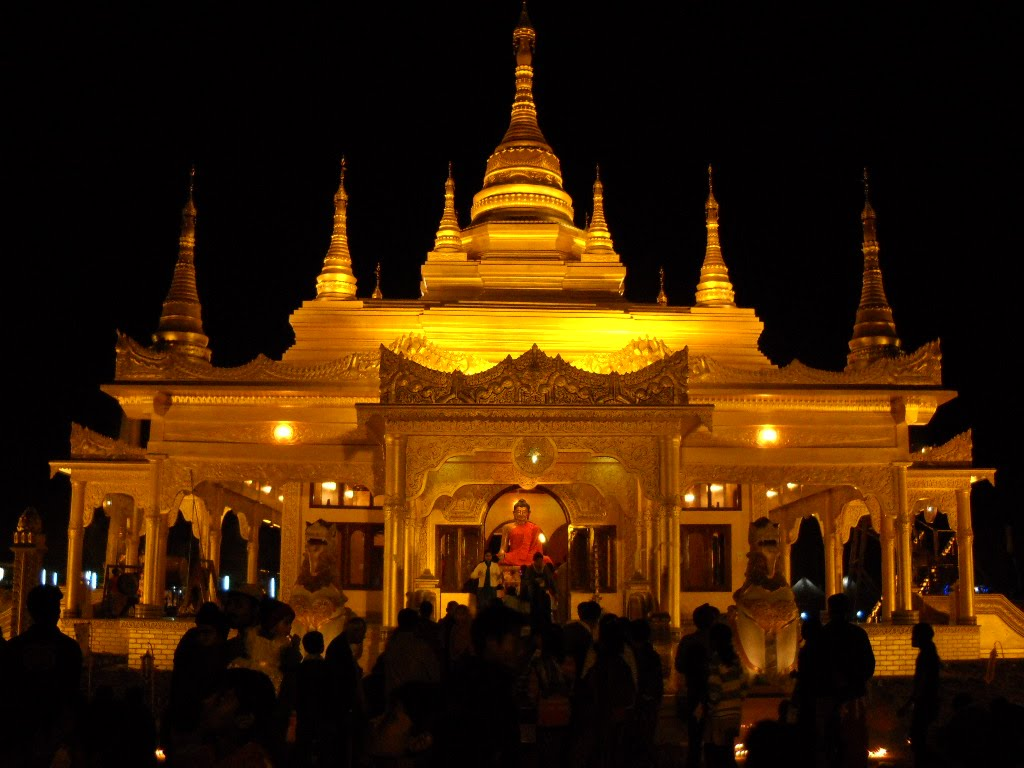
Golden Pagoda (Kongmu Kham) at Tengapani

Hindus consists around 75.57% of the total population while Muslim, Christian and Sikh consists 7.43%, 8.24% and 0.29% respectively. Buddhism is around 5.41% and other religions are 2.91% of the total population.

=== Languages ===
Languages spoken in Tezu Town (2011)
1. Bengali (18.6%)
2. Nepali (18.5%)
3. Bhojpuri (12.1%)
4. Hindi (10.4%)
5. Mismi (9.84%)
6. Assamese (8.58%)
7. Others (22.1%)

According to Census 2011, Bengali is Spoken by 3,373 people, Nepali at 3,371 people, Bhojpuri by 2,197 people, Hindi at 1,884, Mismi by 1,790 people and Assamese at 1,561.

=== Tibetan diaspora ===
Tezu also has a sizeable population of Tibetan community of about 1500 mostly residing in a settlement called by local name as Lama Camp, Tibetans settled here since the 1960s after fleeing Chinese persecution in their homeland Tibet, till date they have maintained their own custom and tradition, they have built monasteries, health centres, nursing homes, schools etc. with funds from the government and other sources. Lama Camp is located in Tindolong about 6 km (4 mi) from Tezu Bazaar and has 5 camps each camp represent different regions of Tibet mainly Kham, Kongpo, Tsari and Pemako.

== Media and communications ==
State-owned All India Radio has a local station in Tezu which transmits various programs of mass interest. Also, the local TV channel - Matai Communication broadcasts local news, shows and programs.

== Local cultural festivals ==
The major Mishmi God is Ringyajabmalu and the major Mishmi festival is known as Tamladu puja. It is celebrated each year on 15 February. People from all communities and all walks of life are invited to join in the celebrations. The Holy Parshuram Kund is also nearby and thousands of Hindu pilgrims from all over India, and also from neighbouring countries, come to take a holy dip and wash away the sins of millions of births. This is accompanied with a fair at Tezu and takes place every year during the month of January.

Tamladu, the main festival of the Digaru and Miju Mishmi community is celebrated with much gaiety at Tezu and all over the Lohit district. Other festivals such as Mopin (Adi festival), Sangken (Khamti & Singhpo tribe), Reh (Idu Mishmi festival), and Losar (Monpa festival) are also celebrated.

Other than this, Durga Puja (Dusshera), Kali Puja, Ganesh Chaturthi, etc. are also celebrated with much gaiety.

== Educational institutions ==
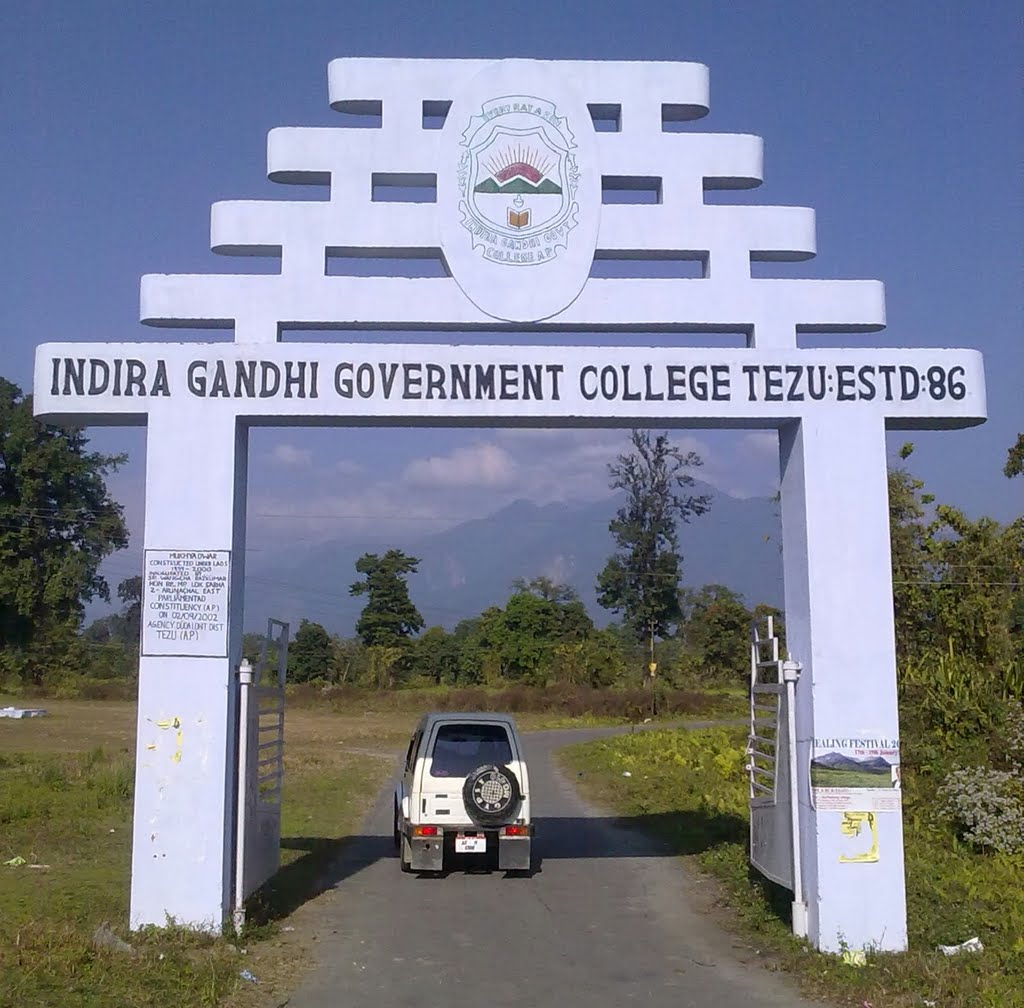
Indira Gandhi Govt. College

- Government Higher School, Tezu
- Government Secondary School, Tezu
- Kendriya Vidyalaya, Tezu
- Krick & Boury Memorial School
- Indira Gandhi Government College
- Teacher's Training Institute (B.Ed College)
- Vivekananda Kendriya Vidyalaya, Tezu
- VKV Tafragam, Tezu
- Arun Jyoti school
- Lohit Valley School
- Government secondary school Telluliang
