= Lohit district =

District in Arunachal Pradesh, India

Coordinates: 28°00′N 96°30′E

- District of Arunachal Pradesh
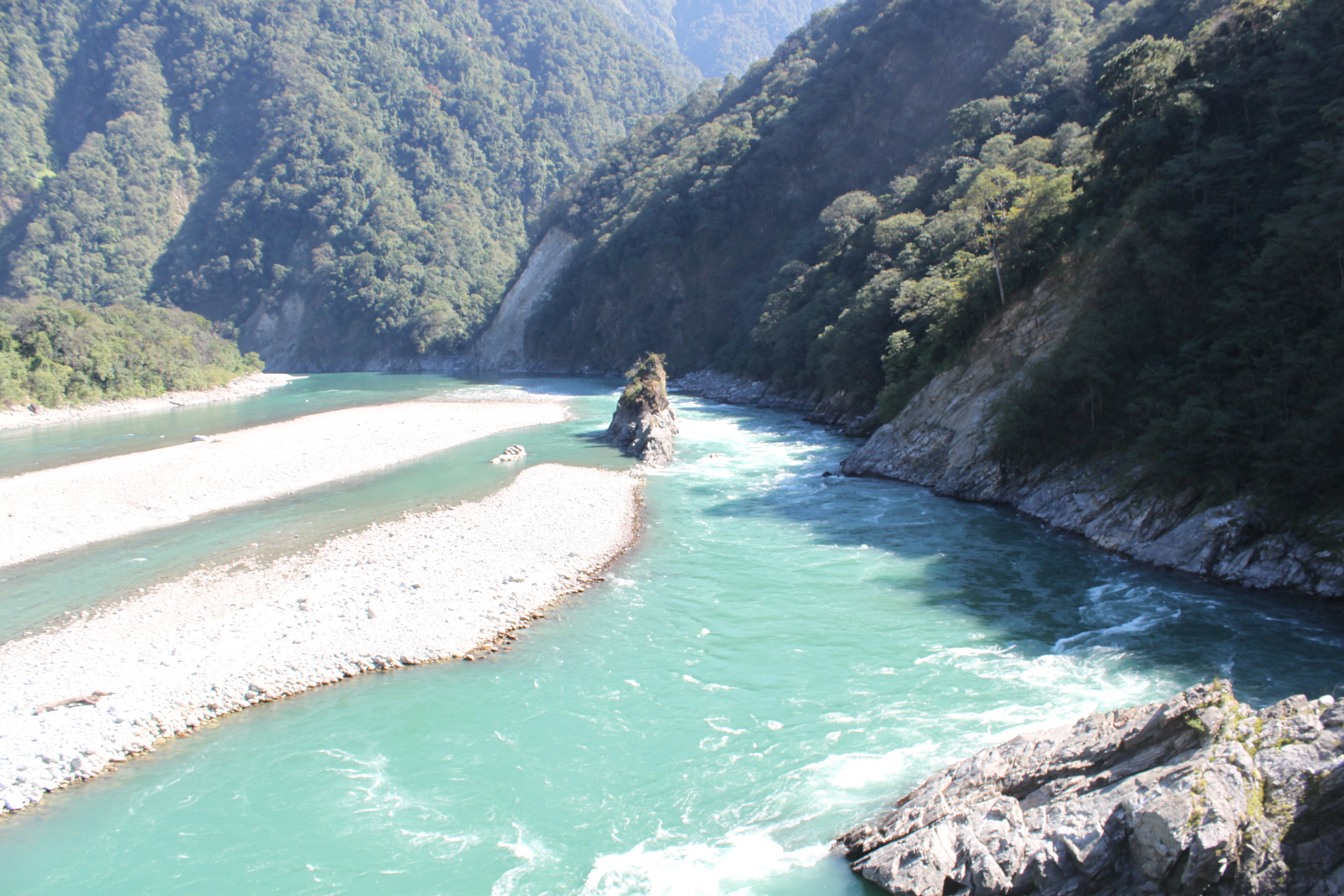
- View of the Lohit River

- Location in Arunachal Pradesh
- Country: India
- State: Arunachal Pradesh
- Division: East
- Headquarters: Tezu
- Tehsils: 3

Government
  - District collector: Prince Dhawan, IAS
  - Lok Sabha constituencies: 1
  - Vidhan Sabha constituencies: 1

Area
  - Total: 2,402 km^{2} (927 sq mi)

Population (2011)
  - Total: 49,776
  - Density: 20.72/km^{2} (53.67/sq mi)

Demographics
  - Literacy: 69.9%
  - Sex ratio: 901
- Time zone: UTC+05:30 (IST)
- Major highways: nh-13
- Website: lohit.nic.in

Lohit district (/ˈləʊhɪt/) is an administrative district in the state of Arunachal Pradesh in India. The district headquarters is located at Tezu. As of 2011 it is the third most populous district of Arunachal Pradesh, after Papum Pare and Changlang.

== Etymology ==
It was known earlier as the Mishmi Hills. The district is named after the Lohit River and consists of the river valley and hills/mountains to the north and south.

== History ==
During medieval times, the present district was under the control of the rulers of the Chutiya Kingdom. The Chutiyas controlled the area from the early 13th century to the 16th century and during the 19th century, it became one of the last territories to be brought under British control after the punitive Abor and Mishmi Expedition in the first decade of 20th century.

In June 1980, Dibang Valley district was split from Lohit (and has since been bifurcated again to create the new Lower Dibang Valley district). On 16 February 2004, Anjaw district was carved out from the northern part of Lohit district bordering Tibet and Myanmar, with its headquarters at Hawai. Anjaw was carved out under the Arunachal Pradesh Re-organization of Districts Amendment Bill. Namsai was split from Lohit in 2013.

== Geography ==
Wakro is an important sub-division of this district. It is a disyllabic word originated from the local dialect Miju Mishmi. Another important sub-division of Lohit is Sunpura, which is located near the Assam-Arunachal border. Lohit district occupies an area of 11,402 km^{2} (4,402 sq mi) and has a population of 143,478 (as of 2001).

== Divisions ==
Four Arunachal Pradesh Legislative Assembly constituencies are located in this district: Tezu, Wakro, Sunpura. All of these are part of Arunachal East Lok Sabha constituency.

== Transport ==
The area is highly inaccessible, and it was only in 2004 that a permanent bridge has been made operational across the Lohit at the holy site of Parashuram Kund, giving a round-the-year connection to Tezu. About 100 km (62 mi) east of Tezu lies the small town of Hayuliang, and this is slated to become the headquarters of a new district. The road along the Lohit runs right up to the small garrison town of Walong just south of the Chinese border, site of the famous Battle of Walong in 1962.

== Demographics ==
According to the 2011 census the erstwhile Lohit district has a population of 145,726, roughly equal to the nation of Saint Lucia. This gives it a ranking of 601st in India (out of a total of 640). The district has a population density of 28 inhabitants per square kilometre (73/sq mi) . Its population growth rate over the decade 2001–2011 was 16.44%. Lohit has a sex ratio of 901 females for every 1000 males, and a literacy rate of 69.88%. The divided district has a population of 49,776. 15,920 are Scheduled Tribes.

Lohit is the home of the Adi, Zekhring, Khampti, Singpho and Mishmi tribes. A small group of Tibetans have settled in Lohit since the 1960s. The Zekhring are Tibetan Buddhists; the Khampti and Singpho are Threvada Buddhists, and the Mishmi and Adis are mainly Animists.

=== Languages ===
Languages of Lohit (2011)
1. Nepali (28.2%)
2. Mishmi (24.0%)
3. Hindi (16.4%)
4. Bengali (9.09%)
5. Assamese (5.41%)
6. Adi (2.87%)
7. Tibetan (2.28%)
8. Dogri (1.16%)
9. Punjabi (1.54%)
10. Odia (0.89%)
11. Mizo (0.87%)
12. Others (7.28%)

The most populous language spoken in the district is Nepali, with 28.19% of the population. 24.02% speak Mishmi, 16.4% Hindi, 9.09% Bengali, 5.41% Assamese, 2.87% Adi, 2.28% Tibetan, 1.73% Odia as their first language.

=== Religion ===
Religion in Lohit district (2011)
Religion	Per cent
Hinduism	67.95%
Buddhism	16.78%
Christianity	7.33%
Donyi Polo	4.99%
Islam	2.64%
Others	0.30%

== Flora and fauna ==
In 1989 Lohit district became home to the Kamlang Wildlife Sanctuary, which has an area of 783 km^{2} (302.3 mi^{2}). It is the home to some of the endangered flora and fauna. The district has been found to be an ideal place for Jatropha cultivation, which is used for bio-diesel making.

In the western part of the district, north of the Lohit River occurs the new subspecies of hoolock gibbon, which has been described and named as Mishmi Hills hoolock H. h. mishmiensis. A new giant flying squirrel named as Mishmi Hills giant flying squirrel also occurs north of the Lohit River.

== See also ==
- Arunachal Pradesh Khaw Tai rice
